

136001–136100 

|-bgcolor=#E9E9E9
| 136001 ||  || — || November 4, 2002 || Palomar || NEAT || — || align=right | 4.2 km || 
|-id=002 bgcolor=#E9E9E9
| 136002 ||  || — || November 4, 2002 || Palomar || NEAT || ADE || align=right | 6.2 km || 
|-id=003 bgcolor=#E9E9E9
| 136003 ||  || — || November 6, 2002 || Socorro || LINEAR || — || align=right | 3.8 km || 
|-id=004 bgcolor=#E9E9E9
| 136004 ||  || — || November 6, 2002 || Socorro || LINEAR || XIZ || align=right | 2.4 km || 
|-id=005 bgcolor=#E9E9E9
| 136005 ||  || — || November 6, 2002 || Anderson Mesa || LONEOS || NEM || align=right | 3.8 km || 
|-id=006 bgcolor=#E9E9E9
| 136006 ||  || — || November 6, 2002 || Anderson Mesa || LONEOS || — || align=right | 1.4 km || 
|-id=007 bgcolor=#d6d6d6
| 136007 ||  || — || November 3, 2002 || Haleakala || NEAT || — || align=right | 4.7 km || 
|-id=008 bgcolor=#E9E9E9
| 136008 ||  || — || November 3, 2002 || Haleakala || NEAT || — || align=right | 2.7 km || 
|-id=009 bgcolor=#E9E9E9
| 136009 ||  || — || November 5, 2002 || Socorro || LINEAR || HEN || align=right | 1.9 km || 
|-id=010 bgcolor=#E9E9E9
| 136010 ||  || — || November 6, 2002 || Anderson Mesa || LONEOS || — || align=right | 2.0 km || 
|-id=011 bgcolor=#E9E9E9
| 136011 ||  || — || November 6, 2002 || Anderson Mesa || LONEOS || — || align=right | 3.9 km || 
|-id=012 bgcolor=#E9E9E9
| 136012 ||  || — || November 6, 2002 || Socorro || LINEAR || — || align=right | 4.8 km || 
|-id=013 bgcolor=#E9E9E9
| 136013 ||  || — || November 6, 2002 || Socorro || LINEAR || XIZ || align=right | 2.5 km || 
|-id=014 bgcolor=#E9E9E9
| 136014 ||  || — || November 7, 2002 || Socorro || LINEAR || — || align=right | 2.6 km || 
|-id=015 bgcolor=#d6d6d6
| 136015 ||  || — || November 7, 2002 || Anderson Mesa || LONEOS || ALA || align=right | 8.5 km || 
|-id=016 bgcolor=#E9E9E9
| 136016 ||  || — || November 7, 2002 || Socorro || LINEAR || — || align=right | 4.9 km || 
|-id=017 bgcolor=#d6d6d6
| 136017 ||  || — || November 7, 2002 || Socorro || LINEAR || KOR || align=right | 2.9 km || 
|-id=018 bgcolor=#d6d6d6
| 136018 ||  || — || November 7, 2002 || Socorro || LINEAR || SAN || align=right | 2.7 km || 
|-id=019 bgcolor=#E9E9E9
| 136019 ||  || — || November 7, 2002 || Socorro || LINEAR || AGN || align=right | 2.5 km || 
|-id=020 bgcolor=#fefefe
| 136020 ||  || — || November 7, 2002 || Socorro || LINEAR || FLO || align=right | 1.1 km || 
|-id=021 bgcolor=#d6d6d6
| 136021 ||  || — || November 7, 2002 || Socorro || LINEAR || — || align=right | 5.3 km || 
|-id=022 bgcolor=#d6d6d6
| 136022 ||  || — || November 7, 2002 || Socorro || LINEAR || — || align=right | 6.4 km || 
|-id=023 bgcolor=#d6d6d6
| 136023 ||  || — || November 11, 2002 || Socorro || LINEAR || EUP || align=right | 9.0 km || 
|-id=024 bgcolor=#E9E9E9
| 136024 ||  || — || November 8, 2002 || Socorro || LINEAR || — || align=right | 5.4 km || 
|-id=025 bgcolor=#E9E9E9
| 136025 ||  || — || November 11, 2002 || Socorro || LINEAR || PAD || align=right | 3.7 km || 
|-id=026 bgcolor=#d6d6d6
| 136026 ||  || — || November 12, 2002 || Anderson Mesa || LONEOS || — || align=right | 5.3 km || 
|-id=027 bgcolor=#E9E9E9
| 136027 ||  || — || November 11, 2002 || Anderson Mesa || LONEOS || — || align=right | 2.7 km || 
|-id=028 bgcolor=#d6d6d6
| 136028 ||  || — || November 11, 2002 || Socorro || LINEAR || EUP || align=right | 6.4 km || 
|-id=029 bgcolor=#E9E9E9
| 136029 ||  || — || November 12, 2002 || Socorro || LINEAR || MRX || align=right | 1.8 km || 
|-id=030 bgcolor=#E9E9E9
| 136030 ||  || — || November 12, 2002 || Socorro || LINEAR || — || align=right | 5.0 km || 
|-id=031 bgcolor=#d6d6d6
| 136031 ||  || — || November 12, 2002 || Socorro || LINEAR || — || align=right | 5.5 km || 
|-id=032 bgcolor=#d6d6d6
| 136032 ||  || — || November 12, 2002 || Socorro || LINEAR || — || align=right | 7.4 km || 
|-id=033 bgcolor=#d6d6d6
| 136033 ||  || — || November 13, 2002 || Palomar || NEAT || — || align=right | 4.3 km || 
|-id=034 bgcolor=#E9E9E9
| 136034 ||  || — || November 13, 2002 || Socorro || LINEAR || GAL || align=right | 3.4 km || 
|-id=035 bgcolor=#d6d6d6
| 136035 ||  || — || November 12, 2002 || Socorro || LINEAR || — || align=right | 5.0 km || 
|-id=036 bgcolor=#E9E9E9
| 136036 ||  || — || November 13, 2002 || Palomar || NEAT || — || align=right | 5.2 km || 
|-id=037 bgcolor=#E9E9E9
| 136037 ||  || — || November 6, 2002 || Socorro || LINEAR || — || align=right | 3.7 km || 
|-id=038 bgcolor=#E9E9E9
| 136038 || 2002 WR || — || November 20, 2002 || Socorro || LINEAR || PAL || align=right | 3.8 km || 
|-id=039 bgcolor=#E9E9E9
| 136039 ||  || — || November 21, 2002 || Palomar || NEAT || — || align=right | 5.0 km || 
|-id=040 bgcolor=#d6d6d6
| 136040 ||  || — || November 24, 2002 || Palomar || NEAT || THM || align=right | 5.3 km || 
|-id=041 bgcolor=#E9E9E9
| 136041 ||  || — || November 27, 2002 || Anderson Mesa || LONEOS || — || align=right | 5.3 km || 
|-id=042 bgcolor=#E9E9E9
| 136042 ||  || — || November 27, 2002 || Anderson Mesa || LONEOS || — || align=right | 5.4 km || 
|-id=043 bgcolor=#E9E9E9
| 136043 ||  || — || November 28, 2002 || Anderson Mesa || LONEOS || PAD || align=right | 3.6 km || 
|-id=044 bgcolor=#E9E9E9
| 136044 ||  || — || December 1, 2002 || Socorro || LINEAR || — || align=right | 1.9 km || 
|-id=045 bgcolor=#E9E9E9
| 136045 ||  || — || December 2, 2002 || Socorro || LINEAR || — || align=right | 5.2 km || 
|-id=046 bgcolor=#d6d6d6
| 136046 ||  || — || December 2, 2002 || Socorro || LINEAR || — || align=right | 4.7 km || 
|-id=047 bgcolor=#d6d6d6
| 136047 ||  || — || December 3, 2002 || Palomar || NEAT || — || align=right | 4.0 km || 
|-id=048 bgcolor=#d6d6d6
| 136048 ||  || — || December 3, 2002 || Palomar || NEAT || — || align=right | 7.0 km || 
|-id=049 bgcolor=#E9E9E9
| 136049 ||  || — || December 5, 2002 || Socorro || LINEAR || — || align=right | 3.8 km || 
|-id=050 bgcolor=#d6d6d6
| 136050 ||  || — || December 2, 2002 || Socorro || LINEAR || — || align=right | 3.8 km || 
|-id=051 bgcolor=#E9E9E9
| 136051 ||  || — || December 5, 2002 || Socorro || LINEAR || — || align=right | 5.1 km || 
|-id=052 bgcolor=#d6d6d6
| 136052 ||  || — || December 6, 2002 || Socorro || LINEAR || — || align=right | 7.0 km || 
|-id=053 bgcolor=#E9E9E9
| 136053 ||  || — || December 6, 2002 || Socorro || LINEAR || JUN || align=right | 2.7 km || 
|-id=054 bgcolor=#E9E9E9
| 136054 ||  || — || December 7, 2002 || Palomar || NEAT || EUN || align=right | 2.6 km || 
|-id=055 bgcolor=#E9E9E9
| 136055 ||  || — || December 6, 2002 || Socorro || LINEAR || — || align=right | 5.4 km || 
|-id=056 bgcolor=#d6d6d6
| 136056 ||  || — || December 10, 2002 || Socorro || LINEAR || — || align=right | 4.5 km || 
|-id=057 bgcolor=#d6d6d6
| 136057 ||  || — || December 10, 2002 || Socorro || LINEAR || KOR || align=right | 2.5 km || 
|-id=058 bgcolor=#E9E9E9
| 136058 ||  || — || December 10, 2002 || Kitt Peak || Spacewatch || — || align=right | 4.5 km || 
|-id=059 bgcolor=#d6d6d6
| 136059 ||  || — || December 10, 2002 || Palomar || NEAT || — || align=right | 7.5 km || 
|-id=060 bgcolor=#E9E9E9
| 136060 ||  || — || December 11, 2002 || Socorro || LINEAR || PAE || align=right | 7.1 km || 
|-id=061 bgcolor=#E9E9E9
| 136061 ||  || — || December 11, 2002 || Socorro || LINEAR || — || align=right | 2.7 km || 
|-id=062 bgcolor=#d6d6d6
| 136062 ||  || — || December 11, 2002 || Socorro || LINEAR || — || align=right | 7.2 km || 
|-id=063 bgcolor=#d6d6d6
| 136063 ||  || — || December 11, 2002 || Palomar || NEAT || — || align=right | 7.5 km || 
|-id=064 bgcolor=#E9E9E9
| 136064 ||  || — || December 13, 2002 || Palomar || NEAT || EUN || align=right | 3.1 km || 
|-id=065 bgcolor=#E9E9E9
| 136065 ||  || — || December 13, 2002 || Haleakala || NEAT || — || align=right | 4.5 km || 
|-id=066 bgcolor=#d6d6d6
| 136066 ||  || — || December 11, 2002 || Palomar || NEAT || — || align=right | 6.2 km || 
|-id=067 bgcolor=#E9E9E9
| 136067 ||  || — || December 12, 2002 || Socorro || LINEAR || — || align=right | 3.0 km || 
|-id=068 bgcolor=#d6d6d6
| 136068 ||  || — || December 5, 2002 || Socorro || LINEAR || HYG || align=right | 5.5 km || 
|-id=069 bgcolor=#d6d6d6
| 136069 ||  || — || December 5, 2002 || Socorro || LINEAR || KOR || align=right | 2.4 km || 
|-id=070 bgcolor=#E9E9E9
| 136070 ||  || — || December 5, 2002 || Socorro || LINEAR || — || align=right | 3.9 km || 
|-id=071 bgcolor=#d6d6d6
| 136071 ||  || — || December 5, 2002 || Socorro || LINEAR || TEL || align=right | 2.5 km || 
|-id=072 bgcolor=#E9E9E9
| 136072 || 2002 YN || — || December 27, 2002 || Anderson Mesa || LONEOS || CLO || align=right | 3.8 km || 
|-id=073 bgcolor=#d6d6d6
| 136073 ||  || — || December 28, 2002 || Needville || Needville Obs. || — || align=right | 7.5 km || 
|-id=074 bgcolor=#d6d6d6
| 136074 ||  || — || December 31, 2002 || Socorro || LINEAR || — || align=right | 7.3 km || 
|-id=075 bgcolor=#d6d6d6
| 136075 ||  || — || December 31, 2002 || Socorro || LINEAR || — || align=right | 5.9 km || 
|-id=076 bgcolor=#d6d6d6
| 136076 ||  || — || January 3, 2003 || Socorro || LINEAR || — || align=right | 8.3 km || 
|-id=077 bgcolor=#E9E9E9
| 136077 ||  || — || January 4, 2003 || Socorro || LINEAR || — || align=right | 5.7 km || 
|-id=078 bgcolor=#d6d6d6
| 136078 ||  || — || January 4, 2003 || Socorro || LINEAR || — || align=right | 7.4 km || 
|-id=079 bgcolor=#E9E9E9
| 136079 ||  || — || January 7, 2003 || Socorro || LINEAR || — || align=right | 5.8 km || 
|-id=080 bgcolor=#d6d6d6
| 136080 ||  || — || January 5, 2003 || Socorro || LINEAR || — || align=right | 8.6 km || 
|-id=081 bgcolor=#d6d6d6
| 136081 ||  || — || January 5, 2003 || Socorro || LINEAR || ALA || align=right | 6.2 km || 
|-id=082 bgcolor=#fefefe
| 136082 ||  || — || January 5, 2003 || Socorro || LINEAR || — || align=right | 2.8 km || 
|-id=083 bgcolor=#d6d6d6
| 136083 ||  || — || January 7, 2003 || Socorro || LINEAR || — || align=right | 6.7 km || 
|-id=084 bgcolor=#d6d6d6
| 136084 ||  || — || January 7, 2003 || Socorro || LINEAR || LUT || align=right | 9.6 km || 
|-id=085 bgcolor=#d6d6d6
| 136085 ||  || — || January 10, 2003 || Socorro || LINEAR || — || align=right | 6.0 km || 
|-id=086 bgcolor=#E9E9E9
| 136086 ||  || — || January 10, 2003 || Socorro || LINEAR || — || align=right | 4.4 km || 
|-id=087 bgcolor=#d6d6d6
| 136087 ||  || — || January 1, 2003 || Socorro || LINEAR || — || align=right | 7.6 km || 
|-id=088 bgcolor=#E9E9E9
| 136088 ||  || — || January 26, 2003 || Palomar || NEAT || — || align=right | 3.3 km || 
|-id=089 bgcolor=#d6d6d6
| 136089 ||  || — || January 26, 2003 || Haleakala || NEAT || — || align=right | 7.6 km || 
|-id=090 bgcolor=#d6d6d6
| 136090 ||  || — || January 27, 2003 || Socorro || LINEAR || — || align=right | 4.1 km || 
|-id=091 bgcolor=#d6d6d6
| 136091 ||  || — || January 27, 2003 || Socorro || LINEAR || — || align=right | 7.0 km || 
|-id=092 bgcolor=#d6d6d6
| 136092 ||  || — || January 27, 2003 || Socorro || LINEAR || — || align=right | 8.8 km || 
|-id=093 bgcolor=#fefefe
| 136093 ||  || — || January 27, 2003 || Socorro || LINEAR || — || align=right | 1.3 km || 
|-id=094 bgcolor=#fefefe
| 136094 ||  || — || January 27, 2003 || Socorro || LINEAR || — || align=right | 1.2 km || 
|-id=095 bgcolor=#E9E9E9
| 136095 ||  || — || January 27, 2003 || Haleakala || NEAT || — || align=right | 4.5 km || 
|-id=096 bgcolor=#d6d6d6
| 136096 ||  || — || February 1, 2003 || Haleakala || NEAT || — || align=right | 7.7 km || 
|-id=097 bgcolor=#E9E9E9
| 136097 ||  || — || February 6, 2003 || Palomar || NEAT || EUN || align=right | 2.5 km || 
|-id=098 bgcolor=#d6d6d6
| 136098 || 2003 DD || — || February 19, 2003 || Haleakala || NEAT || CHA || align=right | 3.6 km || 
|-id=099 bgcolor=#E9E9E9
| 136099 ||  || — || February 22, 2003 || Palomar || NEAT || MRX || align=right | 2.4 km || 
|-id=100 bgcolor=#d6d6d6
| 136100 ||  || — || February 26, 2003 || Campo Imperatore || CINEOS || 7:4 || align=right | 6.0 km || 
|}

136101–136200 

|-bgcolor=#d6d6d6
| 136101 ||  || — || March 5, 2003 || Socorro || LINEAR || — || align=right | 7.8 km || 
|-id=102 bgcolor=#E9E9E9
| 136102 ||  || — || March 5, 2003 || Socorro || LINEAR || — || align=right | 4.6 km || 
|-id=103 bgcolor=#E9E9E9
| 136103 ||  || — || March 6, 2003 || Socorro || LINEAR || GEF || align=right | 2.6 km || 
|-id=104 bgcolor=#d6d6d6
| 136104 ||  || — || March 6, 2003 || Socorro || LINEAR || HYG || align=right | 6.6 km || 
|-id=105 bgcolor=#fefefe
| 136105 ||  || — || March 6, 2003 || Anderson Mesa || LONEOS || NYS || align=right | 1.1 km || 
|-id=106 bgcolor=#fefefe
| 136106 ||  || — || March 7, 2003 || Anderson Mesa || LONEOS || NYS || align=right | 1.2 km || 
|-id=107 bgcolor=#E9E9E9
| 136107 ||  || — || March 12, 2003 || Palomar || NEAT || EUN || align=right | 2.3 km || 
|-id=108 bgcolor=#C2E0FF
| 136108 Haumea ||  ||  || March 7, 2003 || Sierra Nevada || Sierra Nevada Obs. || Haumeamoon || align=right | 1595 km || 
|-id=109 bgcolor=#fefefe
| 136109 ||  || — || March 25, 2003 || Kitt Peak || Spacewatch || FLO || align=right data-sort-value="0.81" | 810 m || 
|-id=110 bgcolor=#E9E9E9
| 136110 ||  || — || March 26, 2003 || Palomar || NEAT || PAD || align=right | 3.2 km || 
|-id=111 bgcolor=#E9E9E9
| 136111 ||  || — || March 27, 2003 || Kitt Peak || Spacewatch || — || align=right | 3.0 km || 
|-id=112 bgcolor=#fefefe
| 136112 ||  || — || March 26, 2003 || Kitt Peak || Spacewatch || NYS || align=right | 1.1 km || 
|-id=113 bgcolor=#d6d6d6
| 136113 ||  || — || April 1, 2003 || Socorro || LINEAR || HYG || align=right | 5.4 km || 
|-id=114 bgcolor=#fefefe
| 136114 ||  || — || April 7, 2003 || Palomar || NEAT || — || align=right | 1.0 km || 
|-id=115 bgcolor=#E9E9E9
| 136115 ||  || — || April 24, 2003 || Anderson Mesa || LONEOS || — || align=right | 4.5 km || 
|-id=116 bgcolor=#fefefe
| 136116 ||  || — || April 23, 2003 || Socorro || LINEAR || H || align=right | 1.3 km || 
|-id=117 bgcolor=#fefefe
| 136117 ||  || — || April 26, 2003 || Haleakala || NEAT || H || align=right data-sort-value="0.99" | 990 m || 
|-id=118 bgcolor=#fefefe
| 136118 || 2003 KV || — || May 21, 2003 || Reedy Creek || J. Broughton || — || align=right | 2.9 km || 
|-id=119 bgcolor=#E9E9E9
| 136119 ||  || — || May 29, 2003 || Socorro || LINEAR || — || align=right | 3.2 km || 
|-id=120 bgcolor=#C2E0FF
| 136120 ||  || — || June 1, 2003 || Cerro Tololo || M. W. Buie || res1:3critical || align=right | 117 km || 
|-id=121 bgcolor=#fefefe
| 136121 || 2003 OA || — || July 18, 2003 || Siding Spring || R. H. McNaught || — || align=right data-sort-value="0.91" | 910 m || 
|-id=122 bgcolor=#fefefe
| 136122 ||  || — || July 24, 2003 || Palomar || NEAT || — || align=right | 1.7 km || 
|-id=123 bgcolor=#fefefe
| 136123 ||  || — || August 22, 2003 || Socorro || LINEAR || — || align=right | 1.2 km || 
|-id=124 bgcolor=#fefefe
| 136124 ||  || — || August 23, 2003 || Socorro || LINEAR || NYS || align=right | 1.2 km || 
|-id=125 bgcolor=#E9E9E9
| 136125 ||  || — || August 25, 2003 || Palomar || NEAT || — || align=right | 2.7 km || 
|-id=126 bgcolor=#fefefe
| 136126 ||  || — || August 26, 2003 || Socorro || LINEAR || — || align=right | 1.6 km || 
|-id=127 bgcolor=#d6d6d6
| 136127 ||  || — || September 14, 2003 || Haleakala || NEAT || — || align=right | 6.0 km || 
|-id=128 bgcolor=#fefefe
| 136128 ||  || — || September 17, 2003 || Kitt Peak || Spacewatch || — || align=right | 1.2 km || 
|-id=129 bgcolor=#fefefe
| 136129 ||  || — || September 16, 2003 || Kitt Peak || Spacewatch || FLO || align=right data-sort-value="0.88" | 880 m || 
|-id=130 bgcolor=#fefefe
| 136130 ||  || — || September 17, 2003 || Socorro || LINEAR || — || align=right | 1.5 km || 
|-id=131 bgcolor=#fefefe
| 136131 ||  || — || September 19, 2003 || Socorro || LINEAR || — || align=right | 2.5 km || 
|-id=132 bgcolor=#fefefe
| 136132 ||  || — || September 19, 2003 || Palomar || NEAT || — || align=right | 1.8 km || 
|-id=133 bgcolor=#fefefe
| 136133 ||  || — || September 20, 2003 || Palomar || NEAT || — || align=right | 1.4 km || 
|-id=134 bgcolor=#fefefe
| 136134 ||  || — || September 16, 2003 || Kitt Peak || Spacewatch || — || align=right | 1.4 km || 
|-id=135 bgcolor=#fefefe
| 136135 ||  || — || September 20, 2003 || Palomar || NEAT || — || align=right | 1.2 km || 
|-id=136 bgcolor=#fefefe
| 136136 ||  || — || September 21, 2003 || Kitt Peak || Spacewatch || — || align=right | 1.5 km || 
|-id=137 bgcolor=#E9E9E9
| 136137 ||  || — || September 22, 2003 || Anderson Mesa || LONEOS || — || align=right | 4.3 km || 
|-id=138 bgcolor=#fefefe
| 136138 ||  || — || September 21, 2003 || Anderson Mesa || LONEOS || — || align=right | 1.5 km || 
|-id=139 bgcolor=#fefefe
| 136139 ||  || — || September 24, 2003 || Socorro || LINEAR || PHO || align=right | 2.6 km || 
|-id=140 bgcolor=#fefefe
| 136140 ||  || — || September 29, 2003 || Desert Eagle || W. K. Y. Yeung || FLO || align=right | 1.4 km || 
|-id=141 bgcolor=#fefefe
| 136141 ||  || — || September 26, 2003 || Socorro || LINEAR || — || align=right | 1.0 km || 
|-id=142 bgcolor=#fefefe
| 136142 ||  || — || September 27, 2003 || Socorro || LINEAR || FLO || align=right | 1.1 km || 
|-id=143 bgcolor=#fefefe
| 136143 ||  || — || September 26, 2003 || Socorro || LINEAR || FLO || align=right | 1.3 km || 
|-id=144 bgcolor=#fefefe
| 136144 ||  || — || September 28, 2003 || Socorro || LINEAR || FLO || align=right | 1.1 km || 
|-id=145 bgcolor=#fefefe
| 136145 ||  || — || September 29, 2003 || Socorro || LINEAR || FLO || align=right | 1.2 km || 
|-id=146 bgcolor=#FA8072
| 136146 ||  || — || September 28, 2003 || Socorro || LINEAR || — || align=right | 1.1 km || 
|-id=147 bgcolor=#E9E9E9
| 136147 ||  || — || September 29, 2003 || Anderson Mesa || LONEOS || — || align=right | 2.6 km || 
|-id=148 bgcolor=#fefefe
| 136148 ||  || — || September 30, 2003 || Socorro || LINEAR || — || align=right | 1.5 km || 
|-id=149 bgcolor=#FA8072
| 136149 ||  || — || September 29, 2003 || Goodricke-Pigott || J. W. Kessel || — || align=right | 1.2 km || 
|-id=150 bgcolor=#fefefe
| 136150 || 2003 TJ || — || October 2, 2003 || Socorro || LINEAR || — || align=right | 2.2 km || 
|-id=151 bgcolor=#fefefe
| 136151 ||  || — || October 1, 2003 || Goodricke-Pigott || J. W. Kessel || — || align=right | 1.7 km || 
|-id=152 bgcolor=#fefefe
| 136152 ||  || — || October 14, 2003 || Anderson Mesa || LONEOS || FLO || align=right | 1.1 km || 
|-id=153 bgcolor=#fefefe
| 136153 ||  || — || October 2, 2003 || Haleakala || NEAT || PHO || align=right | 1.9 km || 
|-id=154 bgcolor=#fefefe
| 136154 ||  || — || October 14, 2003 || Anderson Mesa || LONEOS || — || align=right | 1.3 km || 
|-id=155 bgcolor=#fefefe
| 136155 ||  || — || October 1, 2003 || Kitt Peak || Spacewatch || FLO || align=right data-sort-value="0.89" | 890 m || 
|-id=156 bgcolor=#E9E9E9
| 136156 ||  || — || October 1, 2003 || Anderson Mesa || LONEOS || — || align=right | 2.1 km || 
|-id=157 bgcolor=#fefefe
| 136157 ||  || — || October 2, 2003 || Kitt Peak || Spacewatch || FLO || align=right data-sort-value="0.99" | 990 m || 
|-id=158 bgcolor=#fefefe
| 136158 ||  || — || October 16, 2003 || Kitt Peak || Spacewatch || V || align=right | 1.1 km || 
|-id=159 bgcolor=#fefefe
| 136159 ||  || — || October 16, 2003 || Kitt Peak || Spacewatch || — || align=right | 1.1 km || 
|-id=160 bgcolor=#fefefe
| 136160 ||  || — || October 16, 2003 || Anderson Mesa || LONEOS || — || align=right | 1.3 km || 
|-id=161 bgcolor=#fefefe
| 136161 ||  || — || October 22, 2003 || Kitt Peak || Spacewatch || — || align=right | 1.2 km || 
|-id=162 bgcolor=#fefefe
| 136162 ||  || — || October 21, 2003 || Fountain Hills || Fountain Hills Obs. || V || align=right | 1.2 km || 
|-id=163 bgcolor=#fefefe
| 136163 ||  || — || October 16, 2003 || Anderson Mesa || LONEOS || — || align=right | 3.0 km || 
|-id=164 bgcolor=#fefefe
| 136164 ||  || — || October 24, 2003 || Socorro || LINEAR || — || align=right | 1.2 km || 
|-id=165 bgcolor=#E9E9E9
| 136165 ||  || — || October 16, 2003 || Anderson Mesa || LONEOS || — || align=right | 2.9 km || 
|-id=166 bgcolor=#d6d6d6
| 136166 ||  || — || October 19, 2003 || Kitt Peak || Spacewatch || HYG || align=right | 4.8 km || 
|-id=167 bgcolor=#fefefe
| 136167 ||  || — || October 18, 2003 || Kitt Peak || Spacewatch || — || align=right | 1.2 km || 
|-id=168 bgcolor=#fefefe
| 136168 ||  || — || October 19, 2003 || Anderson Mesa || LONEOS || V || align=right | 1.2 km || 
|-id=169 bgcolor=#fefefe
| 136169 ||  || — || October 19, 2003 || Kitt Peak || Spacewatch || — || align=right | 1.2 km || 
|-id=170 bgcolor=#E9E9E9
| 136170 ||  || — || October 17, 2003 || Anderson Mesa || LONEOS || WIT || align=right | 1.8 km || 
|-id=171 bgcolor=#E9E9E9
| 136171 ||  || — || October 18, 2003 || Kitt Peak || Spacewatch || AST || align=right | 2.5 km || 
|-id=172 bgcolor=#E9E9E9
| 136172 ||  || — || October 19, 2003 || Kitt Peak || Spacewatch || — || align=right | 3.2 km || 
|-id=173 bgcolor=#fefefe
| 136173 ||  || — || October 18, 2003 || Palomar || NEAT || — || align=right | 1.8 km || 
|-id=174 bgcolor=#fefefe
| 136174 ||  || — || October 19, 2003 || Palomar || NEAT || FLO || align=right | 1.3 km || 
|-id=175 bgcolor=#fefefe
| 136175 ||  || — || October 19, 2003 || Palomar || NEAT || V || align=right | 1.2 km || 
|-id=176 bgcolor=#E9E9E9
| 136176 ||  || — || October 18, 2003 || Anderson Mesa || LONEOS || — || align=right | 3.8 km || 
|-id=177 bgcolor=#fefefe
| 136177 ||  || — || October 18, 2003 || Anderson Mesa || LONEOS || FLO || align=right | 1.2 km || 
|-id=178 bgcolor=#fefefe
| 136178 ||  || — || October 18, 2003 || Anderson Mesa || LONEOS || V || align=right | 1.1 km || 
|-id=179 bgcolor=#fefefe
| 136179 ||  || — || October 18, 2003 || Anderson Mesa || LONEOS || V || align=right | 1.4 km || 
|-id=180 bgcolor=#fefefe
| 136180 ||  || — || October 21, 2003 || Palomar || NEAT || — || align=right | 1.2 km || 
|-id=181 bgcolor=#fefefe
| 136181 ||  || — || October 21, 2003 || Socorro || LINEAR || — || align=right | 1.00 km || 
|-id=182 bgcolor=#fefefe
| 136182 ||  || — || October 21, 2003 || Kitt Peak || Spacewatch || MAS || align=right data-sort-value="0.97" | 970 m || 
|-id=183 bgcolor=#E9E9E9
| 136183 ||  || — || October 22, 2003 || Socorro || LINEAR || — || align=right | 5.8 km || 
|-id=184 bgcolor=#fefefe
| 136184 ||  || — || October 23, 2003 || Anderson Mesa || LONEOS || — || align=right | 1.5 km || 
|-id=185 bgcolor=#fefefe
| 136185 ||  || — || October 23, 2003 || Anderson Mesa || LONEOS || — || align=right | 1.5 km || 
|-id=186 bgcolor=#fefefe
| 136186 ||  || — || October 23, 2003 || Kitt Peak || Spacewatch || V || align=right | 1.1 km || 
|-id=187 bgcolor=#fefefe
| 136187 ||  || — || October 21, 2003 || Socorro || LINEAR || — || align=right | 1.8 km || 
|-id=188 bgcolor=#d6d6d6
| 136188 ||  || — || October 24, 2003 || Kitt Peak || Spacewatch || KOR || align=right | 1.4 km || 
|-id=189 bgcolor=#fefefe
| 136189 ||  || — || October 23, 2003 || Kitt Peak || Spacewatch || — || align=right data-sort-value="0.93" | 930 m || 
|-id=190 bgcolor=#fefefe
| 136190 ||  || — || October 24, 2003 || Socorro || LINEAR || — || align=right | 1.4 km || 
|-id=191 bgcolor=#fefefe
| 136191 ||  || — || October 24, 2003 || Haleakala || NEAT || V || align=right | 1.1 km || 
|-id=192 bgcolor=#fefefe
| 136192 ||  || — || October 22, 2003 || Palomar || NEAT || PHO || align=right | 1.9 km || 
|-id=193 bgcolor=#fefefe
| 136193 ||  || — || October 25, 2003 || Socorro || LINEAR || FLO || align=right | 1.3 km || 
|-id=194 bgcolor=#fefefe
| 136194 ||  || — || October 28, 2003 || Socorro || LINEAR || — || align=right | 1.3 km || 
|-id=195 bgcolor=#fefefe
| 136195 ||  || — || October 30, 2003 || Socorro || LINEAR || — || align=right | 1.8 km || 
|-id=196 bgcolor=#fefefe
| 136196 ||  || — || October 26, 2003 || Socorro || LINEAR || V || align=right data-sort-value="0.99" | 990 m || 
|-id=197 bgcolor=#fefefe
| 136197 Johnandrews ||  ||  || October 22, 2003 || Kitt Peak || M. W. Buie || — || align=right | 1.0 km || 
|-id=198 bgcolor=#E9E9E9
| 136198 ||  || — || October 16, 2003 || Kitt Peak || Spacewatch || AST || align=right | 4.2 km || 
|-id=199 bgcolor=#C2E0FF
| 136199 Eris ||  ||  || October 21, 2003 || Palomar || M. E. Brown, C. Trujillo, D. L. Rabinowitz || SDOmooncritical || align=right | 2326 km || 
|-id=200 bgcolor=#fefefe
| 136200 ||  || — || November 15, 2003 || Kitt Peak || Spacewatch || — || align=right | 1.8 km || 
|}

136201–136300 

|-bgcolor=#fefefe
| 136201 ||  || — || November 15, 2003 || Palomar || NEAT || — || align=right | 1.0 km || 
|-id=202 bgcolor=#fefefe
| 136202 ||  || — || November 18, 2003 || Palomar || NEAT || FLO || align=right | 1.3 km || 
|-id=203 bgcolor=#fefefe
| 136203 ||  || — || November 18, 2003 || Palomar || NEAT || — || align=right | 1.5 km || 
|-id=204 bgcolor=#C7FF8F
| 136204 ||  || — || November 16, 2003 || Kitt Peak || Spacewatch || centaur || align=right | 118 km || 
|-id=205 bgcolor=#fefefe
| 136205 ||  || — || November 18, 2003 || Kitt Peak || Spacewatch || — || align=right | 1.8 km || 
|-id=206 bgcolor=#fefefe
| 136206 ||  || — || November 19, 2003 || Socorro || LINEAR || — || align=right | 1.7 km || 
|-id=207 bgcolor=#fefefe
| 136207 ||  || — || November 19, 2003 || Socorro || LINEAR || FLO || align=right | 1.2 km || 
|-id=208 bgcolor=#fefefe
| 136208 ||  || — || November 19, 2003 || Socorro || LINEAR || — || align=right | 1.6 km || 
|-id=209 bgcolor=#fefefe
| 136209 ||  || — || November 19, 2003 || Socorro || LINEAR || — || align=right | 1.8 km || 
|-id=210 bgcolor=#fefefe
| 136210 ||  || — || November 18, 2003 || Kitt Peak || Spacewatch || — || align=right | 1.4 km || 
|-id=211 bgcolor=#fefefe
| 136211 ||  || — || November 18, 2003 || Palomar || NEAT || V || align=right | 1.2 km || 
|-id=212 bgcolor=#fefefe
| 136212 ||  || — || November 19, 2003 || Kitt Peak || Spacewatch || — || align=right | 1.5 km || 
|-id=213 bgcolor=#E9E9E9
| 136213 ||  || — || November 19, 2003 || Socorro || LINEAR || — || align=right | 2.1 km || 
|-id=214 bgcolor=#fefefe
| 136214 ||  || — || November 19, 2003 || Socorro || LINEAR || FLO || align=right | 1.2 km || 
|-id=215 bgcolor=#E9E9E9
| 136215 ||  || — || November 19, 2003 || Kitt Peak || Spacewatch || — || align=right | 2.4 km || 
|-id=216 bgcolor=#fefefe
| 136216 ||  || — || November 20, 2003 || Socorro || LINEAR || — || align=right | 1.2 km || 
|-id=217 bgcolor=#fefefe
| 136217 ||  || — || November 20, 2003 || Socorro || LINEAR || FLO || align=right | 1.2 km || 
|-id=218 bgcolor=#fefefe
| 136218 ||  || — || November 20, 2003 || Socorro || LINEAR || — || align=right | 1.3 km || 
|-id=219 bgcolor=#fefefe
| 136219 ||  || — || November 19, 2003 || Palomar || NEAT || KLI || align=right | 3.7 km || 
|-id=220 bgcolor=#fefefe
| 136220 ||  || — || November 20, 2003 || Socorro || LINEAR || — || align=right | 1.4 km || 
|-id=221 bgcolor=#fefefe
| 136221 ||  || — || November 20, 2003 || Socorro || LINEAR || — || align=right | 1.3 km || 
|-id=222 bgcolor=#fefefe
| 136222 ||  || — || November 19, 2003 || Socorro || LINEAR || — || align=right | 1.5 km || 
|-id=223 bgcolor=#fefefe
| 136223 ||  || — || November 19, 2003 || Catalina || CSS || V || align=right | 1.1 km || 
|-id=224 bgcolor=#fefefe
| 136224 ||  || — || November 21, 2003 || Socorro || LINEAR || FLO || align=right | 1.4 km || 
|-id=225 bgcolor=#fefefe
| 136225 ||  || — || November 20, 2003 || Socorro || LINEAR || — || align=right | 1.7 km || 
|-id=226 bgcolor=#fefefe
| 136226 ||  || — || November 20, 2003 || Socorro || LINEAR || V || align=right | 1.0 km || 
|-id=227 bgcolor=#fefefe
| 136227 ||  || — || November 21, 2003 || Socorro || LINEAR || — || align=right | 1.3 km || 
|-id=228 bgcolor=#fefefe
| 136228 ||  || — || November 21, 2003 || Socorro || LINEAR || ERI || align=right | 3.1 km || 
|-id=229 bgcolor=#fefefe
| 136229 ||  || — || November 20, 2003 || Socorro || LINEAR || — || align=right | 2.1 km || 
|-id=230 bgcolor=#fefefe
| 136230 ||  || — || November 20, 2003 || Socorro || LINEAR || V || align=right | 1.2 km || 
|-id=231 bgcolor=#fefefe
| 136231 ||  || — || November 20, 2003 || Socorro || LINEAR || V || align=right | 1.2 km || 
|-id=232 bgcolor=#fefefe
| 136232 ||  || — || November 20, 2003 || Socorro || LINEAR || FLO || align=right | 1.3 km || 
|-id=233 bgcolor=#fefefe
| 136233 ||  || — || November 20, 2003 || Socorro || LINEAR || FLO || align=right | 1.2 km || 
|-id=234 bgcolor=#fefefe
| 136234 ||  || — || November 20, 2003 || Socorro || LINEAR || FLO || align=right | 1.5 km || 
|-id=235 bgcolor=#fefefe
| 136235 ||  || — || November 20, 2003 || Kitt Peak || Spacewatch || V || align=right | 1.3 km || 
|-id=236 bgcolor=#fefefe
| 136236 ||  || — || November 21, 2003 || Socorro || LINEAR || FLO || align=right | 1.3 km || 
|-id=237 bgcolor=#E9E9E9
| 136237 ||  || — || November 21, 2003 || Socorro || LINEAR || — || align=right | 3.8 km || 
|-id=238 bgcolor=#fefefe
| 136238 ||  || — || November 21, 2003 || Socorro || LINEAR || — || align=right | 1.9 km || 
|-id=239 bgcolor=#fefefe
| 136239 ||  || — || November 21, 2003 || Socorro || LINEAR || — || align=right | 1.4 km || 
|-id=240 bgcolor=#fefefe
| 136240 ||  || — || November 21, 2003 || Palomar || NEAT || — || align=right | 2.1 km || 
|-id=241 bgcolor=#fefefe
| 136241 ||  || — || November 20, 2003 || Socorro || LINEAR || — || align=right | 1.8 km || 
|-id=242 bgcolor=#fefefe
| 136242 || 2003 XZ || — || December 1, 2003 || Kitt Peak || Spacewatch || V || align=right data-sort-value="0.99" | 990 m || 
|-id=243 bgcolor=#fefefe
| 136243 ||  || — || December 1, 2003 || Socorro || LINEAR || V || align=right data-sort-value="0.89" | 890 m || 
|-id=244 bgcolor=#fefefe
| 136244 ||  || — || December 1, 2003 || Socorro || LINEAR || V || align=right data-sort-value="0.99" | 990 m || 
|-id=245 bgcolor=#fefefe
| 136245 ||  || — || December 1, 2003 || Socorro || LINEAR || — || align=right | 1.2 km || 
|-id=246 bgcolor=#fefefe
| 136246 ||  || — || December 3, 2003 || Anderson Mesa || LONEOS || — || align=right | 1.7 km || 
|-id=247 bgcolor=#fefefe
| 136247 ||  || — || December 3, 2003 || Socorro || LINEAR || NYS || align=right data-sort-value="0.97" | 970 m || 
|-id=248 bgcolor=#E9E9E9
| 136248 ||  || — || December 4, 2003 || Socorro || LINEAR || — || align=right | 2.4 km || 
|-id=249 bgcolor=#fefefe
| 136249 ||  || — || December 3, 2003 || Socorro || LINEAR || — || align=right | 1.4 km || 
|-id=250 bgcolor=#fefefe
| 136250 ||  || — || December 14, 2003 || Palomar || NEAT || — || align=right | 1.9 km || 
|-id=251 bgcolor=#fefefe
| 136251 ||  || — || December 14, 2003 || Palomar || NEAT || FLO || align=right | 1.0 km || 
|-id=252 bgcolor=#fefefe
| 136252 ||  || — || December 3, 2003 || Anderson Mesa || LONEOS || — || align=right | 1.9 km || 
|-id=253 bgcolor=#fefefe
| 136253 ||  || — || December 4, 2003 || Socorro || LINEAR || — || align=right | 2.3 km || 
|-id=254 bgcolor=#E9E9E9
| 136254 ||  || — || December 17, 2003 || Palomar || NEAT || — || align=right | 2.6 km || 
|-id=255 bgcolor=#fefefe
| 136255 ||  || — || December 16, 2003 || Catalina || CSS || — || align=right | 1.4 km || 
|-id=256 bgcolor=#fefefe
| 136256 ||  || — || December 18, 2003 || Socorro || LINEAR || — || align=right | 2.3 km || 
|-id=257 bgcolor=#fefefe
| 136257 ||  || — || December 18, 2003 || Kitt Peak || Spacewatch || MAS || align=right | 1.0 km || 
|-id=258 bgcolor=#fefefe
| 136258 ||  || — || December 19, 2003 || Socorro || LINEAR || — || align=right | 1.8 km || 
|-id=259 bgcolor=#fefefe
| 136259 ||  || — || December 17, 2003 || Bergisch Gladbach || W. Bickel || — || align=right | 1.5 km || 
|-id=260 bgcolor=#fefefe
| 136260 ||  || — || December 19, 2003 || Socorro || LINEAR || FLO || align=right | 1.5 km || 
|-id=261 bgcolor=#fefefe
| 136261 ||  || — || December 19, 2003 || Kitt Peak || Spacewatch || — || align=right | 1.3 km || 
|-id=262 bgcolor=#fefefe
| 136262 ||  || — || December 19, 2003 || Socorro || LINEAR || MAS || align=right | 1.6 km || 
|-id=263 bgcolor=#E9E9E9
| 136263 ||  || — || December 19, 2003 || Socorro || LINEAR || — || align=right | 4.4 km || 
|-id=264 bgcolor=#E9E9E9
| 136264 ||  || — || December 21, 2003 || Socorro || LINEAR || BRU || align=right | 5.5 km || 
|-id=265 bgcolor=#E9E9E9
| 136265 ||  || — || December 18, 2003 || Socorro || LINEAR || EUN || align=right | 2.5 km || 
|-id=266 bgcolor=#E9E9E9
| 136266 ||  || — || December 18, 2003 || Socorro || LINEAR || — || align=right | 5.7 km || 
|-id=267 bgcolor=#d6d6d6
| 136267 ||  || — || December 18, 2003 || Socorro || LINEAR || LIX || align=right | 10 km || 
|-id=268 bgcolor=#E9E9E9
| 136268 ||  || — || December 18, 2003 || Kitt Peak || Spacewatch || — || align=right | 1.9 km || 
|-id=269 bgcolor=#fefefe
| 136269 ||  || — || December 19, 2003 || Socorro || LINEAR || — || align=right | 3.0 km || 
|-id=270 bgcolor=#E9E9E9
| 136270 ||  || — || December 19, 2003 || Kitt Peak || Spacewatch || HEN || align=right | 2.3 km || 
|-id=271 bgcolor=#fefefe
| 136271 ||  || — || December 19, 2003 || Socorro || LINEAR || — || align=right | 1.7 km || 
|-id=272 bgcolor=#d6d6d6
| 136272 ||  || — || December 22, 2003 || Kitt Peak || Spacewatch || — || align=right | 4.7 km || 
|-id=273 bgcolor=#fefefe
| 136273 Csermely ||  ||  || December 25, 2003 || Piszkéstető || K. Sárneczky || — || align=right | 1.4 km || 
|-id=274 bgcolor=#E9E9E9
| 136274 ||  || — || December 23, 2003 || Socorro || LINEAR || — || align=right | 3.0 km || 
|-id=275 bgcolor=#fefefe
| 136275 ||  || — || December 23, 2003 || Socorro || LINEAR || — || align=right | 1.7 km || 
|-id=276 bgcolor=#fefefe
| 136276 ||  || — || December 28, 2003 || Socorro || LINEAR || — || align=right | 1.8 km || 
|-id=277 bgcolor=#fefefe
| 136277 ||  || — || December 27, 2003 || Socorro || LINEAR || — || align=right | 1.5 km || 
|-id=278 bgcolor=#fefefe
| 136278 ||  || — || December 27, 2003 || Socorro || LINEAR || PHO || align=right | 2.7 km || 
|-id=279 bgcolor=#fefefe
| 136279 ||  || — || December 27, 2003 || Socorro || LINEAR || — || align=right | 1.5 km || 
|-id=280 bgcolor=#fefefe
| 136280 ||  || — || December 27, 2003 || Kitt Peak || Spacewatch || V || align=right | 1.1 km || 
|-id=281 bgcolor=#E9E9E9
| 136281 ||  || — || December 27, 2003 || Socorro || LINEAR || MAR || align=right | 2.0 km || 
|-id=282 bgcolor=#fefefe
| 136282 ||  || — || December 27, 2003 || Socorro || LINEAR || — || align=right | 1.9 km || 
|-id=283 bgcolor=#d6d6d6
| 136283 ||  || — || December 27, 2003 || Socorro || LINEAR || — || align=right | 7.1 km || 
|-id=284 bgcolor=#fefefe
| 136284 ||  || — || December 28, 2003 || Socorro || LINEAR || — || align=right | 4.2 km || 
|-id=285 bgcolor=#d6d6d6
| 136285 ||  || — || December 28, 2003 || Kitt Peak || Spacewatch || — || align=right | 3.0 km || 
|-id=286 bgcolor=#E9E9E9
| 136286 ||  || — || December 28, 2003 || Socorro || LINEAR || — || align=right | 4.4 km || 
|-id=287 bgcolor=#E9E9E9
| 136287 ||  || — || December 29, 2003 || Socorro || LINEAR || AER || align=right | 2.1 km || 
|-id=288 bgcolor=#E9E9E9
| 136288 ||  || — || January 13, 2004 || Anderson Mesa || LONEOS || — || align=right | 4.0 km || 
|-id=289 bgcolor=#E9E9E9
| 136289 ||  || — || January 3, 2004 || Socorro || LINEAR || HNS || align=right | 3.1 km || 
|-id=290 bgcolor=#d6d6d6
| 136290 ||  || — || January 13, 2004 || Palomar || NEAT || EOS || align=right | 2.9 km || 
|-id=291 bgcolor=#d6d6d6
| 136291 ||  || — || January 15, 2004 || Kitt Peak || Spacewatch || THM || align=right | 4.7 km || 
|-id=292 bgcolor=#E9E9E9
| 136292 ||  || — || January 15, 2004 || Kitt Peak || Spacewatch || HEN || align=right | 2.0 km || 
|-id=293 bgcolor=#d6d6d6
| 136293 ||  || — || January 13, 2004 || Kitt Peak || Spacewatch || EUP || align=right | 5.8 km || 
|-id=294 bgcolor=#fefefe
| 136294 ||  || — || January 13, 2004 || Palomar || NEAT || — || align=right | 1.5 km || 
|-id=295 bgcolor=#fefefe
| 136295 ||  || — || January 16, 2004 || Palomar || NEAT || — || align=right | 1.4 km || 
|-id=296 bgcolor=#fefefe
| 136296 ||  || — || January 16, 2004 || Palomar || NEAT || NYS || align=right | 1.1 km || 
|-id=297 bgcolor=#d6d6d6
| 136297 ||  || — || January 16, 2004 || Palomar || NEAT || EOS || align=right | 3.9 km || 
|-id=298 bgcolor=#E9E9E9
| 136298 ||  || — || January 16, 2004 || Palomar || NEAT || — || align=right | 1.8 km || 
|-id=299 bgcolor=#E9E9E9
| 136299 ||  || — || January 17, 2004 || Palomar || NEAT || MAR || align=right | 2.1 km || 
|-id=300 bgcolor=#E9E9E9
| 136300 ||  || — || January 16, 2004 || Palomar || NEAT || HOF || align=right | 5.5 km || 
|}

136301–136400 

|-bgcolor=#E9E9E9
| 136301 ||  || — || January 16, 2004 || Palomar || NEAT || — || align=right | 2.4 km || 
|-id=302 bgcolor=#E9E9E9
| 136302 ||  || — || January 17, 2004 || Palomar || NEAT || — || align=right | 2.1 km || 
|-id=303 bgcolor=#fefefe
| 136303 ||  || — || January 17, 2004 || Palomar || NEAT || MAS || align=right | 1.2 km || 
|-id=304 bgcolor=#d6d6d6
| 136304 ||  || — || January 19, 2004 || Anderson Mesa || LONEOS || TEL || align=right | 2.1 km || 
|-id=305 bgcolor=#E9E9E9
| 136305 ||  || — || January 19, 2004 || Kitt Peak || Spacewatch || HOF || align=right | 5.6 km || 
|-id=306 bgcolor=#E9E9E9
| 136306 ||  || — || January 19, 2004 || Kitt Peak || Spacewatch || — || align=right | 3.0 km || 
|-id=307 bgcolor=#fefefe
| 136307 ||  || — || January 22, 2004 || Socorro || LINEAR || NYS || align=right | 1.2 km || 
|-id=308 bgcolor=#d6d6d6
| 136308 ||  || — || January 22, 2004 || Socorro || LINEAR || — || align=right | 7.2 km || 
|-id=309 bgcolor=#E9E9E9
| 136309 ||  || — || January 22, 2004 || Socorro || LINEAR || — || align=right | 3.4 km || 
|-id=310 bgcolor=#E9E9E9
| 136310 ||  || — || January 21, 2004 || Socorro || LINEAR || — || align=right | 4.7 km || 
|-id=311 bgcolor=#E9E9E9
| 136311 ||  || — || January 21, 2004 || Socorro || LINEAR || — || align=right | 2.4 km || 
|-id=312 bgcolor=#E9E9E9
| 136312 ||  || — || January 21, 2004 || Socorro || LINEAR || — || align=right | 3.1 km || 
|-id=313 bgcolor=#d6d6d6
| 136313 ||  || — || January 21, 2004 || Socorro || LINEAR || — || align=right | 6.2 km || 
|-id=314 bgcolor=#E9E9E9
| 136314 ||  || — || January 21, 2004 || Socorro || LINEAR || MIS || align=right | 4.2 km || 
|-id=315 bgcolor=#fefefe
| 136315 ||  || — || January 23, 2004 || Anderson Mesa || LONEOS || — || align=right | 1.6 km || 
|-id=316 bgcolor=#E9E9E9
| 136316 ||  || — || January 23, 2004 || Anderson Mesa || LONEOS || — || align=right | 4.6 km || 
|-id=317 bgcolor=#fefefe
| 136317 ||  || — || January 23, 2004 || Socorro || LINEAR || — || align=right | 1.4 km || 
|-id=318 bgcolor=#E9E9E9
| 136318 ||  || — || January 21, 2004 || Socorro || LINEAR || — || align=right | 2.6 km || 
|-id=319 bgcolor=#E9E9E9
| 136319 ||  || — || January 21, 2004 || Socorro || LINEAR || HEN || align=right | 1.5 km || 
|-id=320 bgcolor=#E9E9E9
| 136320 ||  || — || January 22, 2004 || Socorro || LINEAR || — || align=right | 2.4 km || 
|-id=321 bgcolor=#E9E9E9
| 136321 ||  || — || January 24, 2004 || Socorro || LINEAR || — || align=right | 3.0 km || 
|-id=322 bgcolor=#E9E9E9
| 136322 ||  || — || January 24, 2004 || Socorro || LINEAR || — || align=right | 3.5 km || 
|-id=323 bgcolor=#E9E9E9
| 136323 ||  || — || January 26, 2004 || Anderson Mesa || LONEOS || — || align=right | 2.5 km || 
|-id=324 bgcolor=#fefefe
| 136324 ||  || — || January 22, 2004 || Socorro || LINEAR || — || align=right | 1.7 km || 
|-id=325 bgcolor=#E9E9E9
| 136325 ||  || — || January 23, 2004 || Socorro || LINEAR || EUN || align=right | 1.7 km || 
|-id=326 bgcolor=#E9E9E9
| 136326 ||  || — || January 23, 2004 || Socorro || LINEAR || — || align=right | 2.7 km || 
|-id=327 bgcolor=#d6d6d6
| 136327 ||  || — || January 22, 2004 || Palomar || NEAT || EOS || align=right | 5.4 km || 
|-id=328 bgcolor=#E9E9E9
| 136328 ||  || — || January 29, 2004 || Socorro || LINEAR || — || align=right | 4.2 km || 
|-id=329 bgcolor=#d6d6d6
| 136329 ||  || — || January 24, 2004 || Socorro || LINEAR || — || align=right | 5.9 km || 
|-id=330 bgcolor=#fefefe
| 136330 ||  || — || January 28, 2004 || Catalina || CSS || — || align=right | 1.2 km || 
|-id=331 bgcolor=#d6d6d6
| 136331 ||  || — || January 28, 2004 || Catalina || CSS || — || align=right | 5.4 km || 
|-id=332 bgcolor=#E9E9E9
| 136332 ||  || — || January 29, 2004 || Catalina || CSS || HNS || align=right | 2.6 km || 
|-id=333 bgcolor=#d6d6d6
| 136333 ||  || — || January 16, 2004 || Kitt Peak || Spacewatch || — || align=right | 4.5 km || 
|-id=334 bgcolor=#E9E9E9
| 136334 ||  || — || January 17, 2004 || Palomar || NEAT || ADE || align=right | 4.9 km || 
|-id=335 bgcolor=#d6d6d6
| 136335 ||  || — || February 10, 2004 || Palomar || NEAT || THM || align=right | 4.8 km || 
|-id=336 bgcolor=#d6d6d6
| 136336 ||  || — || February 11, 2004 || Catalina || CSS || — || align=right | 3.7 km || 
|-id=337 bgcolor=#E9E9E9
| 136337 ||  || — || February 11, 2004 || Palomar || NEAT || — || align=right | 3.5 km || 
|-id=338 bgcolor=#d6d6d6
| 136338 ||  || — || February 11, 2004 || Palomar || NEAT || — || align=right | 3.9 km || 
|-id=339 bgcolor=#d6d6d6
| 136339 ||  || — || February 11, 2004 || Palomar || NEAT || — || align=right | 3.7 km || 
|-id=340 bgcolor=#E9E9E9
| 136340 ||  || — || February 10, 2004 || Palomar || NEAT || — || align=right | 2.6 km || 
|-id=341 bgcolor=#E9E9E9
| 136341 ||  || — || February 12, 2004 || Kitt Peak || Spacewatch || — || align=right | 3.8 km || 
|-id=342 bgcolor=#d6d6d6
| 136342 ||  || — || February 11, 2004 || Catalina || CSS || ALA || align=right | 6.0 km || 
|-id=343 bgcolor=#d6d6d6
| 136343 ||  || — || February 12, 2004 || Kitt Peak || Spacewatch || KOR || align=right | 2.3 km || 
|-id=344 bgcolor=#fefefe
| 136344 ||  || — || February 12, 2004 || Kitt Peak || Spacewatch || FLO || align=right | 1.2 km || 
|-id=345 bgcolor=#E9E9E9
| 136345 ||  || — || February 11, 2004 || Catalina || CSS || — || align=right | 3.8 km || 
|-id=346 bgcolor=#E9E9E9
| 136346 ||  || — || February 13, 2004 || Kitt Peak || Spacewatch || PAD || align=right | 3.5 km || 
|-id=347 bgcolor=#d6d6d6
| 136347 ||  || — || February 11, 2004 || Catalina || CSS || — || align=right | 5.4 km || 
|-id=348 bgcolor=#E9E9E9
| 136348 ||  || — || February 12, 2004 || Kitt Peak || Spacewatch || — || align=right | 2.5 km || 
|-id=349 bgcolor=#d6d6d6
| 136349 ||  || — || February 12, 2004 || Kitt Peak || Spacewatch || — || align=right | 4.8 km || 
|-id=350 bgcolor=#d6d6d6
| 136350 ||  || — || February 13, 2004 || Palomar || NEAT || — || align=right | 4.4 km || 
|-id=351 bgcolor=#fefefe
| 136351 ||  || — || February 13, 2004 || Palomar || NEAT || V || align=right | 1.3 km || 
|-id=352 bgcolor=#d6d6d6
| 136352 ||  || — || February 11, 2004 || Catalina || CSS || THM || align=right | 4.8 km || 
|-id=353 bgcolor=#fefefe
| 136353 ||  || — || February 11, 2004 || Anderson Mesa || LONEOS || NYS || align=right | 1.5 km || 
|-id=354 bgcolor=#E9E9E9
| 136354 ||  || — || February 11, 2004 || Palomar || NEAT || — || align=right | 3.9 km || 
|-id=355 bgcolor=#E9E9E9
| 136355 ||  || — || February 12, 2004 || Kitt Peak || Spacewatch || HOF || align=right | 4.8 km || 
|-id=356 bgcolor=#fefefe
| 136356 ||  || — || February 14, 2004 || Catalina || CSS || ERI || align=right | 2.6 km || 
|-id=357 bgcolor=#E9E9E9
| 136357 ||  || — || February 12, 2004 || Kitt Peak || Spacewatch || — || align=right | 2.2 km || 
|-id=358 bgcolor=#E9E9E9
| 136358 ||  || — || February 16, 2004 || Kitt Peak || Spacewatch || — || align=right | 3.7 km || 
|-id=359 bgcolor=#E9E9E9
| 136359 ||  || — || February 16, 2004 || Kitt Peak || Spacewatch || — || align=right | 3.1 km || 
|-id=360 bgcolor=#fefefe
| 136360 ||  || — || February 17, 2004 || Socorro || LINEAR || — || align=right | 1.6 km || 
|-id=361 bgcolor=#d6d6d6
| 136361 ||  || — || February 18, 2004 || Catalina || CSS || TIR || align=right | 3.1 km || 
|-id=362 bgcolor=#E9E9E9
| 136362 ||  || — || February 16, 2004 || Kitt Peak || Spacewatch || HOF || align=right | 4.3 km || 
|-id=363 bgcolor=#E9E9E9
| 136363 ||  || — || February 17, 2004 || Socorro || LINEAR || — || align=right | 3.7 km || 
|-id=364 bgcolor=#d6d6d6
| 136364 ||  || — || February 17, 2004 || Palomar || NEAT || NAE || align=right | 4.4 km || 
|-id=365 bgcolor=#E9E9E9
| 136365 ||  || — || March 9, 2004 || Palomar || NEAT || — || align=right | 5.4 km || 
|-id=366 bgcolor=#d6d6d6
| 136366 ||  || — || March 11, 2004 || Palomar || NEAT || — || align=right | 5.5 km || 
|-id=367 bgcolor=#d6d6d6
| 136367 Gierlinger ||  ||  || March 10, 2004 || Altschwendt || W. Ries || 7:4 || align=right | 7.9 km || 
|-id=368 bgcolor=#d6d6d6
| 136368 ||  || — || March 11, 2004 || Palomar || NEAT || BRA || align=right | 3.6 km || 
|-id=369 bgcolor=#fefefe
| 136369 ||  || — || March 15, 2004 || Goodricke-Pigott || Goodricke-Pigott Obs. || FLO || align=right | 1.4 km || 
|-id=370 bgcolor=#fefefe
| 136370 ||  || — || March 14, 2004 || Socorro || LINEAR || V || align=right | 1.1 km || 
|-id=371 bgcolor=#d6d6d6
| 136371 ||  || — || March 15, 2004 || Catalina || CSS || — || align=right | 7.0 km || 
|-id=372 bgcolor=#d6d6d6
| 136372 ||  || — || March 12, 2004 || Palomar || NEAT || HYG || align=right | 3.8 km || 
|-id=373 bgcolor=#d6d6d6
| 136373 ||  || — || March 14, 2004 || Palomar || NEAT || ALA || align=right | 8.8 km || 
|-id=374 bgcolor=#d6d6d6
| 136374 ||  || — || March 15, 2004 || Palomar || NEAT || — || align=right | 5.3 km || 
|-id=375 bgcolor=#d6d6d6
| 136375 ||  || — || March 14, 2004 || Socorro || LINEAR || — || align=right | 3.9 km || 
|-id=376 bgcolor=#E9E9E9
| 136376 ||  || — || March 14, 2004 || Socorro || LINEAR || EUN || align=right | 3.2 km || 
|-id=377 bgcolor=#E9E9E9
| 136377 ||  || — || March 17, 2004 || Kitt Peak || Spacewatch || HOF || align=right | 4.2 km || 
|-id=378 bgcolor=#fefefe
| 136378 ||  || — || March 17, 2004 || Kitt Peak || Spacewatch || NYS || align=right | 1.2 km || 
|-id=379 bgcolor=#d6d6d6
| 136379 ||  || — || March 16, 2004 || Socorro || LINEAR || — || align=right | 5.8 km || 
|-id=380 bgcolor=#d6d6d6
| 136380 ||  || — || March 16, 2004 || Kitt Peak || Spacewatch || — || align=right | 6.0 km || 
|-id=381 bgcolor=#d6d6d6
| 136381 ||  || — || March 16, 2004 || Socorro || LINEAR || HYG || align=right | 3.2 km || 
|-id=382 bgcolor=#E9E9E9
| 136382 ||  || — || March 18, 2004 || Socorro || LINEAR || GEF || align=right | 2.2 km || 
|-id=383 bgcolor=#d6d6d6
| 136383 ||  || — || March 19, 2004 || Socorro || LINEAR || — || align=right | 3.7 km || 
|-id=384 bgcolor=#d6d6d6
| 136384 ||  || — || March 23, 2004 || Socorro || LINEAR || — || align=right | 5.8 km || 
|-id=385 bgcolor=#d6d6d6
| 136385 ||  || — || March 31, 2004 || Socorro || LINEAR || ALA || align=right | 7.3 km || 
|-id=386 bgcolor=#fefefe
| 136386 ||  || — || March 17, 2004 || Kitt Peak || Spacewatch || FLO || align=right | 1.1 km || 
|-id=387 bgcolor=#d6d6d6
| 136387 ||  || — || April 13, 2004 || Palomar || NEAT || TIR || align=right | 5.1 km || 
|-id=388 bgcolor=#E9E9E9
| 136388 ||  || — || April 14, 2004 || Anderson Mesa || LONEOS || — || align=right | 3.3 km || 
|-id=389 bgcolor=#E9E9E9
| 136389 ||  || — || April 19, 2004 || Kitt Peak || Spacewatch || — || align=right | 5.1 km || 
|-id=390 bgcolor=#d6d6d6
| 136390 ||  || — || April 19, 2004 || Socorro || LINEAR || — || align=right | 5.7 km || 
|-id=391 bgcolor=#E9E9E9
| 136391 ||  || — || May 15, 2004 || Socorro || LINEAR || — || align=right | 1.7 km || 
|-id=392 bgcolor=#E9E9E9
| 136392 ||  || — || August 11, 2004 || Socorro || LINEAR || — || align=right | 3.0 km || 
|-id=393 bgcolor=#fefefe
| 136393 ||  || — || September 17, 2004 || Socorro || LINEAR || NYS || align=right | 1.2 km || 
|-id=394 bgcolor=#E9E9E9
| 136394 ||  || — || October 7, 2004 || Socorro || LINEAR || — || align=right | 2.1 km || 
|-id=395 bgcolor=#fefefe
| 136395 ||  || — || October 8, 2004 || Kitt Peak || Spacewatch || NYS || align=right | 1.1 km || 
|-id=396 bgcolor=#fefefe
| 136396 ||  || — || December 10, 2004 || Kitt Peak || Spacewatch || — || align=right | 1.6 km || 
|-id=397 bgcolor=#E9E9E9
| 136397 ||  || — || December 15, 2004 || Socorro || LINEAR || — || align=right | 4.8 km || 
|-id=398 bgcolor=#E9E9E9
| 136398 ||  || — || December 14, 2004 || Kitt Peak || Spacewatch || HEN || align=right | 1.9 km || 
|-id=399 bgcolor=#fefefe
| 136399 ||  || — || December 11, 2004 || Catalina || CSS || H || align=right | 1.0 km || 
|-id=400 bgcolor=#d6d6d6
| 136400 ||  || — || December 14, 2004 || Catalina || CSS || — || align=right | 7.1 km || 
|}

136401–136500 

|-bgcolor=#d6d6d6
| 136401 ||  || — || December 18, 2004 || Mount Lemmon || Mount Lemmon Survey || — || align=right | 4.6 km || 
|-id=402 bgcolor=#fefefe
| 136402 ||  || — || December 18, 2004 || Mount Lemmon || Mount Lemmon Survey || NYS || align=right data-sort-value="0.96" | 960 m || 
|-id=403 bgcolor=#fefefe
| 136403 ||  || — || December 18, 2004 || Mount Lemmon || Mount Lemmon Survey || — || align=right | 1.5 km || 
|-id=404 bgcolor=#fefefe
| 136404 ||  || — || January 6, 2005 || Catalina || CSS || — || align=right | 1.9 km || 
|-id=405 bgcolor=#d6d6d6
| 136405 ||  || — || January 6, 2005 || Socorro || LINEAR || — || align=right | 3.4 km || 
|-id=406 bgcolor=#fefefe
| 136406 ||  || — || January 11, 2005 || Socorro || LINEAR || — || align=right | 1.9 km || 
|-id=407 bgcolor=#fefefe
| 136407 ||  || — || January 13, 2005 || Kitt Peak || Spacewatch || NYS || align=right | 1.2 km || 
|-id=408 bgcolor=#fefefe
| 136408 ||  || — || January 13, 2005 || Kitt Peak || Spacewatch || — || align=right | 1.4 km || 
|-id=409 bgcolor=#fefefe
| 136409 ||  || — || January 13, 2005 || Kitt Peak || Spacewatch || — || align=right | 1.6 km || 
|-id=410 bgcolor=#d6d6d6
| 136410 ||  || — || January 15, 2005 || Catalina || CSS || — || align=right | 3.7 km || 
|-id=411 bgcolor=#fefefe
| 136411 ||  || — || January 15, 2005 || Kitt Peak || Spacewatch || FLO || align=right | 1.2 km || 
|-id=412 bgcolor=#E9E9E9
| 136412 ||  || — || January 18, 2005 || Kitt Peak || Spacewatch || — || align=right | 1.8 km || 
|-id=413 bgcolor=#fefefe
| 136413 ||  || — || February 1, 2005 || Kitt Peak || Spacewatch || FLO || align=right | 1.2 km || 
|-id=414 bgcolor=#E9E9E9
| 136414 ||  || — || February 3, 2005 || Socorro || LINEAR || — || align=right | 3.5 km || 
|-id=415 bgcolor=#fefefe
| 136415 ||  || — || February 2, 2005 || Socorro || LINEAR || — || align=right | 1.6 km || 
|-id=416 bgcolor=#E9E9E9
| 136416 ||  || — || February 2, 2005 || Kitt Peak || Spacewatch || — || align=right | 2.4 km || 
|-id=417 bgcolor=#fefefe
| 136417 ||  || — || February 2, 2005 || Kitt Peak || Spacewatch || — || align=right | 2.0 km || 
|-id=418 bgcolor=#fefefe
| 136418 ||  || — || February 2, 2005 || Kitt Peak || Spacewatch || FLO || align=right | 1.0 km || 
|-id=419 bgcolor=#fefefe
| 136419 ||  || — || February 2, 2005 || Kitt Peak || Spacewatch || — || align=right | 1.5 km || 
|-id=420 bgcolor=#fefefe
| 136420 ||  || — || February 2, 2005 || Catalina || CSS || — || align=right | 1.3 km || 
|-id=421 bgcolor=#fefefe
| 136421 ||  || — || February 2, 2005 || Catalina || CSS || NYS || align=right | 1.2 km || 
|-id=422 bgcolor=#fefefe
| 136422 ||  || — || February 2, 2005 || Catalina || CSS || FLO || align=right data-sort-value="0.98" | 980 m || 
|-id=423 bgcolor=#fefefe
| 136423 ||  || — || February 2, 2005 || Socorro || LINEAR || — || align=right | 1.2 km || 
|-id=424 bgcolor=#fefefe
| 136424 ||  || — || February 2, 2005 || Catalina || CSS || — || align=right | 2.8 km || 
|-id=425 bgcolor=#fefefe
| 136425 ||  || — || February 2, 2005 || Kitt Peak || Spacewatch || — || align=right | 1.4 km || 
|-id=426 bgcolor=#fefefe
| 136426 ||  || — || February 4, 2005 || Anderson Mesa || LONEOS || V || align=right | 1.2 km || 
|-id=427 bgcolor=#fefefe
| 136427 ||  || — || March 1, 2005 || Kitt Peak || Spacewatch || MAS || align=right | 1.1 km || 
|-id=428 bgcolor=#fefefe
| 136428 ||  || — || March 2, 2005 || Catalina || CSS || NYS || align=right | 1.2 km || 
|-id=429 bgcolor=#fefefe
| 136429 ||  || — || March 3, 2005 || Kitt Peak || Spacewatch || LCI || align=right | 2.2 km || 
|-id=430 bgcolor=#fefefe
| 136430 ||  || — || March 3, 2005 || Kitt Peak || Spacewatch || — || align=right | 1.1 km || 
|-id=431 bgcolor=#fefefe
| 136431 ||  || — || March 3, 2005 || Kitt Peak || Spacewatch || ERI || align=right | 2.0 km || 
|-id=432 bgcolor=#fefefe
| 136432 Allenlunsford ||  ||  || March 3, 2005 || Catalina || CSS || NYS || align=right | 1.4 km || 
|-id=433 bgcolor=#E9E9E9
| 136433 ||  || — || March 3, 2005 || Catalina || CSS || — || align=right | 1.6 km || 
|-id=434 bgcolor=#fefefe
| 136434 ||  || — || March 3, 2005 || Catalina || CSS || — || align=right | 3.4 km || 
|-id=435 bgcolor=#fefefe
| 136435 ||  || — || March 3, 2005 || Catalina || CSS || — || align=right | 2.3 km || 
|-id=436 bgcolor=#E9E9E9
| 136436 ||  || — || March 1, 2005 || Catalina || CSS || — || align=right | 2.3 km || 
|-id=437 bgcolor=#E9E9E9
| 136437 ||  || — || March 3, 2005 || Kitt Peak || Spacewatch || — || align=right | 1.7 km || 
|-id=438 bgcolor=#d6d6d6
| 136438 ||  || — || March 3, 2005 || Catalina || CSS || — || align=right | 6.2 km || 
|-id=439 bgcolor=#fefefe
| 136439 ||  || — || March 4, 2005 || Kitt Peak || Spacewatch || V || align=right | 1.1 km || 
|-id=440 bgcolor=#fefefe
| 136440 ||  || — || March 4, 2005 || Kitt Peak || Spacewatch || NYS || align=right | 1.3 km || 
|-id=441 bgcolor=#fefefe
| 136441 ||  || — || March 4, 2005 || Kitt Peak || Spacewatch || MAS || align=right | 1.1 km || 
|-id=442 bgcolor=#fefefe
| 136442 ||  || — || March 4, 2005 || Mount Lemmon || Mount Lemmon Survey || — || align=right | 1.2 km || 
|-id=443 bgcolor=#E9E9E9
| 136443 ||  || — || March 4, 2005 || Socorro || LINEAR || — || align=right | 4.6 km || 
|-id=444 bgcolor=#d6d6d6
| 136444 ||  || — || March 4, 2005 || Catalina || CSS || — || align=right | 6.2 km || 
|-id=445 bgcolor=#E9E9E9
| 136445 ||  || — || March 4, 2005 || Catalina || CSS || — || align=right | 2.3 km || 
|-id=446 bgcolor=#E9E9E9
| 136446 ||  || — || March 4, 2005 || Socorro || LINEAR || — || align=right | 4.5 km || 
|-id=447 bgcolor=#fefefe
| 136447 ||  || — || March 8, 2005 || Anderson Mesa || LONEOS || — || align=right | 1.2 km || 
|-id=448 bgcolor=#d6d6d6
| 136448 ||  || — || March 8, 2005 || Catalina || CSS || LIX || align=right | 6.6 km || 
|-id=449 bgcolor=#E9E9E9
| 136449 ||  || — || March 9, 2005 || Socorro || LINEAR || — || align=right | 4.9 km || 
|-id=450 bgcolor=#fefefe
| 136450 ||  || — || March 10, 2005 || Catalina || CSS || — || align=right | 1.7 km || 
|-id=451 bgcolor=#fefefe
| 136451 ||  || — || March 8, 2005 || Mount Lemmon || Mount Lemmon Survey || — || align=right | 1.3 km || 
|-id=452 bgcolor=#fefefe
| 136452 ||  || — || March 11, 2005 || Mount Lemmon || Mount Lemmon Survey || — || align=right | 1.2 km || 
|-id=453 bgcolor=#fefefe
| 136453 ||  || — || March 8, 2005 || Anderson Mesa || LONEOS || FLO || align=right | 1.3 km || 
|-id=454 bgcolor=#d6d6d6
| 136454 ||  || — || March 9, 2005 || Catalina || CSS || — || align=right | 8.0 km || 
|-id=455 bgcolor=#d6d6d6
| 136455 ||  || — || March 9, 2005 || Mount Lemmon || Mount Lemmon Survey || — || align=right | 8.3 km || 
|-id=456 bgcolor=#E9E9E9
| 136456 ||  || — || March 10, 2005 || Mount Lemmon || Mount Lemmon Survey || — || align=right | 2.2 km || 
|-id=457 bgcolor=#d6d6d6
| 136457 ||  || — || March 8, 2005 || Catalina || CSS || — || align=right | 7.0 km || 
|-id=458 bgcolor=#E9E9E9
| 136458 ||  || — || March 13, 2005 || Catalina || CSS || — || align=right | 1.8 km || 
|-id=459 bgcolor=#E9E9E9
| 136459 ||  || — || March 10, 2005 || Catalina || CSS || — || align=right | 4.5 km || 
|-id=460 bgcolor=#E9E9E9
| 136460 ||  || — || March 10, 2005 || Anderson Mesa || LONEOS || ADE || align=right | 4.6 km || 
|-id=461 bgcolor=#fefefe
| 136461 ||  || — || March 11, 2005 || Kitt Peak || Spacewatch || NYS || align=right | 1.6 km || 
|-id=462 bgcolor=#fefefe
| 136462 ||  || — || March 9, 2005 || Socorro || LINEAR || — || align=right | 1.5 km || 
|-id=463 bgcolor=#fefefe
| 136463 ||  || — || March 10, 2005 || Mount Lemmon || Mount Lemmon Survey || MAS || align=right | 1.5 km || 
|-id=464 bgcolor=#fefefe
| 136464 ||  || — || March 11, 2005 || Socorro || LINEAR || V || align=right | 1.2 km || 
|-id=465 bgcolor=#fefefe
| 136465 ||  || — || March 13, 2005 || Catalina || CSS || — || align=right | 1.7 km || 
|-id=466 bgcolor=#fefefe
| 136466 ||  || — || March 13, 2005 || Catalina || CSS || — || align=right | 1.6 km || 
|-id=467 bgcolor=#E9E9E9
| 136467 ||  || — || March 8, 2005 || Socorro || LINEAR || — || align=right | 2.3 km || 
|-id=468 bgcolor=#fefefe
| 136468 ||  || — || March 11, 2005 || Kitt Peak || Spacewatch || — || align=right | 1.9 km || 
|-id=469 bgcolor=#E9E9E9
| 136469 ||  || — || March 17, 2005 || Goodricke-Pigott || R. A. Tucker || AGN || align=right | 2.8 km || 
|-id=470 bgcolor=#E9E9E9
| 136470 ||  || — || March 30, 2005 || Catalina || CSS || EUN || align=right | 2.4 km || 
|-id=471 bgcolor=#fefefe
| 136471 ||  || — || March 30, 2005 || Catalina || CSS || — || align=right | 1.7 km || 
|-id=472 bgcolor=#C2E0FF
| 136472 Makemake ||  ||  || March 31, 2005 || Palomar || M. E. Brown, C. Trujillo, D. L. Rabinowitz || other TNOmoon || align=right | 1430 km || 
|-id=473 bgcolor=#fefefe
| 136473 Bakosgáspár || 2005 GB ||  || April 1, 2005 || Piszkéstető || K. Sárneczky || — || align=right | 1.7 km || 
|-id=474 bgcolor=#E9E9E9
| 136474 ||  || — || April 3, 2005 || Palomar || NEAT || — || align=right | 5.3 km || 
|-id=475 bgcolor=#E9E9E9
| 136475 ||  || — || April 5, 2005 || Anderson Mesa || LONEOS || — || align=right | 1.4 km || 
|-id=476 bgcolor=#d6d6d6
| 136476 ||  || — || April 6, 2005 || Anderson Mesa || LONEOS || — || align=right | 3.5 km || 
|-id=477 bgcolor=#d6d6d6
| 136477 ||  || — || April 4, 2005 || Catalina || CSS || — || align=right | 6.7 km || 
|-id=478 bgcolor=#fefefe
| 136478 ||  || — || April 2, 2005 || Mount Lemmon || Mount Lemmon Survey || NYS || align=right | 3.2 km || 
|-id=479 bgcolor=#fefefe
| 136479 ||  || — || April 2, 2005 || Mount Lemmon || Mount Lemmon Survey || — || align=right | 1.6 km || 
|-id=480 bgcolor=#d6d6d6
| 136480 ||  || — || April 3, 2005 || Palomar || NEAT || HYG || align=right | 4.5 km || 
|-id=481 bgcolor=#fefefe
| 136481 ||  || — || April 5, 2005 || Mount Lemmon || Mount Lemmon Survey || — || align=right | 1.5 km || 
|-id=482 bgcolor=#d6d6d6
| 136482 ||  || — || April 6, 2005 || Catalina || CSS || — || align=right | 6.4 km || 
|-id=483 bgcolor=#d6d6d6
| 136483 ||  || — || April 6, 2005 || Catalina || CSS || — || align=right | 4.0 km || 
|-id=484 bgcolor=#d6d6d6
| 136484 ||  || — || April 6, 2005 || Catalina || CSS || — || align=right | 4.8 km || 
|-id=485 bgcolor=#fefefe
| 136485 ||  || — || April 4, 2005 || Mount Lemmon || Mount Lemmon Survey || MAS || align=right | 1.3 km || 
|-id=486 bgcolor=#d6d6d6
| 136486 ||  || — || April 6, 2005 || Anderson Mesa || LONEOS || EUP || align=right | 7.1 km || 
|-id=487 bgcolor=#E9E9E9
| 136487 ||  || — || April 9, 2005 || Mount Lemmon || Mount Lemmon Survey || — || align=right | 2.4 km || 
|-id=488 bgcolor=#d6d6d6
| 136488 ||  || — || April 7, 2005 || Catalina || CSS || — || align=right | 5.9 km || 
|-id=489 bgcolor=#E9E9E9
| 136489 ||  || — || April 10, 2005 || Kitt Peak || Spacewatch || — || align=right | 2.9 km || 
|-id=490 bgcolor=#fefefe
| 136490 ||  || — || April 10, 2005 || Kitt Peak || Spacewatch || — || align=right | 1.2 km || 
|-id=491 bgcolor=#d6d6d6
| 136491 ||  || — || April 13, 2005 || Socorro || LINEAR || HYG || align=right | 5.0 km || 
|-id=492 bgcolor=#E9E9E9
| 136492 ||  || — || April 11, 2005 || Goodricke-Pigott || Goodricke-Pigott Obs. || EUN || align=right | 2.1 km || 
|-id=493 bgcolor=#d6d6d6
| 136493 ||  || — || April 9, 2005 || Socorro || LINEAR || ALA || align=right | 6.6 km || 
|-id=494 bgcolor=#d6d6d6
| 136494 ||  || — || April 11, 2005 || Kitt Peak || Spacewatch || — || align=right | 5.4 km || 
|-id=495 bgcolor=#E9E9E9
| 136495 ||  || — || April 13, 2005 || Socorro || LINEAR || — || align=right | 2.3 km || 
|-id=496 bgcolor=#E9E9E9
| 136496 ||  || — || April 12, 2005 || Kitt Peak || Spacewatch || HEN || align=right | 2.1 km || 
|-id=497 bgcolor=#d6d6d6
| 136497 ||  || — || April 16, 2005 || Kitt Peak || Spacewatch || — || align=right | 3.7 km || 
|-id=498 bgcolor=#d6d6d6
| 136498 ||  || — || May 4, 2005 || Catalina || CSS || — || align=right | 9.0 km || 
|-id=499 bgcolor=#d6d6d6
| 136499 ||  || — || May 4, 2005 || Catalina || CSS || — || align=right | 4.0 km || 
|-id=500 bgcolor=#d6d6d6
| 136500 ||  || — || May 9, 2005 || Catalina || CSS || — || align=right | 6.4 km || 
|}

136501–136600 

|-bgcolor=#d6d6d6
| 136501 ||  || — || May 6, 2005 || Catalina || CSS || EOS || align=right | 3.4 km || 
|-id=502 bgcolor=#d6d6d6
| 136502 ||  || — || May 13, 2005 || Siding Spring || SSS || MEL || align=right | 6.4 km || 
|-id=503 bgcolor=#d6d6d6
| 136503 ||  || — || May 13, 2005 || Catalina || CSS || — || align=right | 4.1 km || 
|-id=504 bgcolor=#fefefe
| 136504 ||  || — || May 4, 2005 || Kitt Peak || Spacewatch || — || align=right | 3.0 km || 
|-id=505 bgcolor=#E9E9E9
| 136505 ||  || — || May 8, 2005 || Kitt Peak || Spacewatch || — || align=right | 1.5 km || 
|-id=506 bgcolor=#d6d6d6
| 136506 ||  || — || May 16, 2005 || Kitt Peak || Spacewatch || — || align=right | 4.5 km || 
|-id=507 bgcolor=#fefefe
| 136507 ||  || — || May 16, 2005 || Palomar || NEAT || — || align=right | 1.9 km || 
|-id=508 bgcolor=#d6d6d6
| 136508 ||  || — || May 18, 2005 || Siding Spring || SSS || — || align=right | 4.9 km || 
|-id=509 bgcolor=#d6d6d6
| 136509 ||  || — || May 31, 2005 || Catalina || CSS || — || align=right | 3.3 km || 
|-id=510 bgcolor=#d6d6d6
| 136510 || 2005 LH || — || June 1, 2005 || RAS || A. Lowe || — || align=right | 4.3 km || 
|-id=511 bgcolor=#fefefe
| 136511 ||  || — || June 27, 2005 || Kitt Peak || Spacewatch || V || align=right | 1.1 km || 
|-id=512 bgcolor=#d6d6d6
| 136512 ||  || — || July 5, 2005 || Palomar || NEAT || — || align=right | 5.4 km || 
|-id=513 bgcolor=#d6d6d6
| 136513 ||  || — || July 5, 2005 || Siding Spring || SSS || — || align=right | 5.0 km || 
|-id=514 bgcolor=#d6d6d6
| 136514 ||  || — || August 25, 2005 || Palomar || NEAT || HYG || align=right | 5.5 km || 
|-id=515 bgcolor=#fefefe
| 136515 ||  || — || August 25, 2005 || Palomar || NEAT || — || align=right | 1.7 km || 
|-id=516 bgcolor=#E9E9E9
| 136516 ||  || — || August 26, 2005 || Palomar || NEAT || — || align=right | 3.1 km || 
|-id=517 bgcolor=#fefefe
| 136517 ||  || — || September 25, 2005 || Kitt Peak || Spacewatch || — || align=right | 2.3 km || 
|-id=518 bgcolor=#E9E9E9
| 136518 Opitz ||  ||  || September 28, 2005 || Piszkéstető || K. Sárneczky || — || align=right | 2.6 km || 
|-id=519 bgcolor=#E9E9E9
| 136519 ||  || — || September 30, 2005 || Mount Lemmon || Mount Lemmon Survey || WIT || align=right | 1.7 km || 
|-id=520 bgcolor=#fefefe
| 136520 ||  || — || October 28, 2005 || Catalina || CSS || — || align=right | 1.3 km || 
|-id=521 bgcolor=#fefefe
| 136521 ||  || — || February 20, 2006 || Kitt Peak || Spacewatch || — || align=right | 1.3 km || 
|-id=522 bgcolor=#E9E9E9
| 136522 ||  || — || February 24, 2006 || Catalina || CSS || — || align=right | 3.6 km || 
|-id=523 bgcolor=#E9E9E9
| 136523 ||  || — || February 28, 2006 || Socorro || LINEAR || — || align=right | 5.1 km || 
|-id=524 bgcolor=#fefefe
| 136524 ||  || — || March 2, 2006 || Mount Lemmon || Mount Lemmon Survey || MAS || align=right | 1.7 km || 
|-id=525 bgcolor=#E9E9E9
| 136525 ||  || — || March 23, 2006 || Kitt Peak || Spacewatch || — || align=right | 2.0 km || 
|-id=526 bgcolor=#d6d6d6
| 136526 ||  || — || March 24, 2006 || Anderson Mesa || LONEOS || — || align=right | 7.6 km || 
|-id=527 bgcolor=#E9E9E9
| 136527 ||  || — || April 2, 2006 || Kitt Peak || Spacewatch || — || align=right | 2.4 km || 
|-id=528 bgcolor=#E9E9E9
| 136528 ||  || — || April 2, 2006 || Kitt Peak || Spacewatch || AGN || align=right | 2.3 km || 
|-id=529 bgcolor=#E9E9E9
| 136529 ||  || — || April 7, 2006 || Socorro || LINEAR || — || align=right | 2.6 km || 
|-id=530 bgcolor=#fefefe
| 136530 ||  || — || April 9, 2006 || Siding Spring || SSS || V || align=right | 1.1 km || 
|-id=531 bgcolor=#fefefe
| 136531 ||  || — || April 18, 2006 || Palomar || NEAT || — || align=right | 1.5 km || 
|-id=532 bgcolor=#E9E9E9
| 136532 ||  || — || April 19, 2006 || Kitt Peak || Spacewatch || — || align=right | 3.2 km || 
|-id=533 bgcolor=#d6d6d6
| 136533 ||  || — || April 20, 2006 || Kitt Peak || Spacewatch || THM || align=right | 4.8 km || 
|-id=534 bgcolor=#d6d6d6
| 136534 ||  || — || May 20, 2006 || Anderson Mesa || LONEOS || ALA || align=right | 7.0 km || 
|-id=535 bgcolor=#fefefe
| 136535 ||  || — || May 25, 2006 || Kitt Peak || Spacewatch || — || align=right | 3.9 km || 
|-id=536 bgcolor=#E9E9E9
| 136536 ||  || — || June 11, 2006 || Palomar || NEAT || EUN || align=right | 2.3 km || 
|-id=537 bgcolor=#fefefe
| 136537 ||  || — || June 11, 2006 || Palomar || NEAT || — || align=right | 1.4 km || 
|-id=538 bgcolor=#E9E9E9
| 136538 ||  || — || June 19, 2006 || Mount Lemmon || Mount Lemmon Survey || ADE || align=right | 4.3 km || 
|-id=539 bgcolor=#E9E9E9
| 136539 || 2144 P-L || — || September 24, 1960 || Palomar || PLS || — || align=right | 2.8 km || 
|-id=540 bgcolor=#E9E9E9
| 136540 || 2543 P-L || — || September 24, 1960 || Palomar || PLS || — || align=right | 4.4 km || 
|-id=541 bgcolor=#d6d6d6
| 136541 || 3012 P-L || — || September 24, 1960 || Palomar || PLS || EOS || align=right | 4.4 km || 
|-id=542 bgcolor=#E9E9E9
| 136542 || 3089 P-L || — || September 25, 1960 || Palomar || PLS || — || align=right | 2.4 km || 
|-id=543 bgcolor=#d6d6d6
| 136543 || 3111 P-L || — || September 24, 1960 || Palomar || PLS || EOS || align=right | 4.1 km || 
|-id=544 bgcolor=#E9E9E9
| 136544 || 4773 P-L || — || September 24, 1960 || Palomar || PLS || HEN || align=right | 1.9 km || 
|-id=545 bgcolor=#E9E9E9
| 136545 || 5552 P-L || — || October 17, 1960 || Palomar || PLS || RAF || align=right | 1.6 km || 
|-id=546 bgcolor=#fefefe
| 136546 || 6208 P-L || — || September 24, 1960 || Palomar || PLS || LCI || align=right | 1.9 km || 
|-id=547 bgcolor=#E9E9E9
| 136547 || 6297 P-L || — || September 24, 1960 || Palomar || PLS || — || align=right | 3.1 km || 
|-id=548 bgcolor=#d6d6d6
| 136548 || 6329 P-L || — || September 24, 1960 || Palomar || PLS || — || align=right | 4.9 km || 
|-id=549 bgcolor=#fefefe
| 136549 || 6702 P-L || — || September 24, 1960 || Palomar || PLS || — || align=right | 1.4 km || 
|-id=550 bgcolor=#E9E9E9
| 136550 || 6747 P-L || — || September 24, 1960 || Palomar || PLS || GER || align=right | 2.2 km || 
|-id=551 bgcolor=#fefefe
| 136551 || 6864 P-L || — || September 24, 1960 || Palomar || PLS || — || align=right | 1.3 km || 
|-id=552 bgcolor=#d6d6d6
| 136552 || 1047 T-2 || — || September 29, 1973 || Palomar || PLS || LIX || align=right | 6.7 km || 
|-id=553 bgcolor=#d6d6d6
| 136553 || 1445 T-2 || — || September 29, 1973 || Palomar || PLS || — || align=right | 6.7 km || 
|-id=554 bgcolor=#E9E9E9
| 136554 || 2062 T-2 || — || September 29, 1973 || Palomar || PLS || — || align=right | 1.7 km || 
|-id=555 bgcolor=#E9E9E9
| 136555 || 2254 T-2 || — || September 29, 1973 || Palomar || PLS || — || align=right | 3.2 km || 
|-id=556 bgcolor=#fefefe
| 136556 || 3299 T-2 || — || September 30, 1973 || Palomar || PLS || — || align=right | 1.4 km || 
|-id=557 bgcolor=#C2FFFF
| 136557 Neleus || 5214 T-2 ||  || September 25, 1973 || Palomar || PLS || L4 || align=right | 16 km || 
|-id=558 bgcolor=#d6d6d6
| 136558 || 5429 T-2 || — || September 30, 1973 || Palomar || PLS || — || align=right | 7.1 km || 
|-id=559 bgcolor=#fefefe
| 136559 || 1035 T-3 || — || October 17, 1977 || Palomar || PLS || — || align=right | 1.4 km || 
|-id=560 bgcolor=#fefefe
| 136560 || 1109 T-3 || — || October 17, 1977 || Palomar || PLS || V || align=right | 1.2 km || 
|-id=561 bgcolor=#d6d6d6
| 136561 || 1304 T-3 || — || October 17, 1977 || Palomar || PLS || — || align=right | 9.0 km || 
|-id=562 bgcolor=#d6d6d6
| 136562 || 2609 T-3 || — || October 16, 1977 || Palomar || PLS || TRP || align=right | 4.9 km || 
|-id=563 bgcolor=#E9E9E9
| 136563 || 3288 T-3 || — || October 16, 1977 || Palomar || PLS || — || align=right | 1.4 km || 
|-id=564 bgcolor=#FFC2E0
| 136564 || 1977 VA || — || November 7, 1977 || Palomar || E. F. Helin, E. M. Shoemaker || AMO || align=right data-sort-value="0.4" | 400 m || 
|-id=565 bgcolor=#d6d6d6
| 136565 ||  || — || December 7, 1977 || Palomar || S. J. Bus || 627 || align=right | 6.4 km || 
|-id=566 bgcolor=#fefefe
| 136566 ||  || — || November 7, 1978 || Palomar || E. F. Helin, S. J. Bus || NYS || align=right | 2.2 km || 
|-id=567 bgcolor=#d6d6d6
| 136567 ||  || — || July 24, 1979 || Siding Spring || S. J. Bus || — || align=right | 4.4 km || 
|-id=568 bgcolor=#FA8072
| 136568 || 1980 XB || — || December 13, 1980 || Mount Hamilton || E. A. Harlan || — || align=right | 2.8 km || 
|-id=569 bgcolor=#d6d6d6
| 136569 ||  || — || March 2, 1981 || Siding Spring || S. J. Bus || — || align=right | 6.1 km || 
|-id=570 bgcolor=#d6d6d6
| 136570 ||  || — || March 2, 1981 || Siding Spring || S. J. Bus || — || align=right | 4.5 km || 
|-id=571 bgcolor=#d6d6d6
| 136571 ||  || — || March 1, 1981 || Siding Spring || S. J. Bus || — || align=right | 5.9 km || 
|-id=572 bgcolor=#fefefe
| 136572 ||  || — || March 1, 1981 || Siding Spring || S. J. Bus || — || align=right | 2.0 km || 
|-id=573 bgcolor=#fefefe
| 136573 ||  || — || March 1, 1981 || Siding Spring || S. J. Bus || — || align=right | 2.0 km || 
|-id=574 bgcolor=#E9E9E9
| 136574 ||  || — || March 6, 1981 || Siding Spring || S. J. Bus || — || align=right | 4.2 km || 
|-id=575 bgcolor=#fefefe
| 136575 ||  || — || March 6, 1981 || Siding Spring || S. J. Bus || — || align=right | 1.4 km || 
|-id=576 bgcolor=#fefefe
| 136576 ||  || — || March 1, 1981 || Siding Spring || S. J. Bus || — || align=right | 1.2 km || 
|-id=577 bgcolor=#d6d6d6
| 136577 ||  || — || March 1, 1981 || Siding Spring || S. J. Bus || — || align=right | 5.3 km || 
|-id=578 bgcolor=#fefefe
| 136578 ||  || — || March 1, 1981 || Siding Spring || S. J. Bus || — || align=right | 1.8 km || 
|-id=579 bgcolor=#E9E9E9
| 136579 ||  || — || March 6, 1981 || Siding Spring || S. J. Bus || — || align=right | 2.4 km || 
|-id=580 bgcolor=#fefefe
| 136580 || 1984 WL || — || November 27, 1984 || Caussols || J. Ciffréo || — || align=right | 2.3 km || 
|-id=581 bgcolor=#E9E9E9
| 136581 || 1986 GX || — || April 4, 1986 || Kitt Peak || Spacewatch || — || align=right | 4.0 km || 
|-id=582 bgcolor=#FFC2E0
| 136582 || 1992 BA || — || January 27, 1992 || Kitt Peak || Spacewatch || AMO || align=right data-sort-value="0.38" | 380 m || 
|-id=583 bgcolor=#d6d6d6
| 136583 ||  || — || February 29, 1992 || La Silla || UESAC || EMA || align=right | 5.8 km || 
|-id=584 bgcolor=#fefefe
| 136584 ||  || — || March 8, 1992 || La Silla || UESAC || — || align=right | 1.8 km || 
|-id=585 bgcolor=#E9E9E9
| 136585 ||  || — || September 22, 1992 || La Silla || E. W. Elst || — || align=right | 5.6 km || 
|-id=586 bgcolor=#fefefe
| 136586 ||  || — || October 18, 1992 || Kitt Peak || Spacewatch || NYS || align=right data-sort-value="0.95" | 950 m || 
|-id=587 bgcolor=#fefefe
| 136587 ||  || — || March 17, 1993 || La Silla || UESAC || — || align=right | 1.2 km || 
|-id=588 bgcolor=#fefefe
| 136588 ||  || — || March 17, 1993 || La Silla || UESAC || — || align=right | 1.6 km || 
|-id=589 bgcolor=#fefefe
| 136589 ||  || — || March 17, 1993 || La Silla || UESAC || NYS || align=right data-sort-value="0.98" | 980 m || 
|-id=590 bgcolor=#d6d6d6
| 136590 ||  || — || March 17, 1993 || La Silla || UESAC || — || align=right | 4.6 km || 
|-id=591 bgcolor=#d6d6d6
| 136591 ||  || — || March 17, 1993 || La Silla || UESAC || — || align=right | 3.9 km || 
|-id=592 bgcolor=#d6d6d6
| 136592 ||  || — || March 17, 1993 || La Silla || UESAC || — || align=right | 5.2 km || 
|-id=593 bgcolor=#d6d6d6
| 136593 ||  || — || March 17, 1993 || La Silla || UESAC || — || align=right | 7.0 km || 
|-id=594 bgcolor=#fefefe
| 136594 ||  || — || March 21, 1993 || La Silla || UESAC || — || align=right | 1.7 km || 
|-id=595 bgcolor=#d6d6d6
| 136595 ||  || — || March 21, 1993 || La Silla || UESAC || — || align=right | 5.7 km || 
|-id=596 bgcolor=#d6d6d6
| 136596 ||  || — || March 21, 1993 || La Silla || UESAC || — || align=right | 5.4 km || 
|-id=597 bgcolor=#d6d6d6
| 136597 ||  || — || March 19, 1993 || La Silla || UESAC || — || align=right | 4.0 km || 
|-id=598 bgcolor=#fefefe
| 136598 ||  || — || March 19, 1993 || La Silla || UESAC || — || align=right | 1.3 km || 
|-id=599 bgcolor=#fefefe
| 136599 ||  || — || March 19, 1993 || La Silla || UESAC || NYS || align=right | 1.3 km || 
|-id=600 bgcolor=#fefefe
| 136600 ||  || — || March 19, 1993 || La Silla || UESAC || NYS || align=right | 1.0 km || 
|}

136601–136700 

|-bgcolor=#d6d6d6
| 136601 ||  || — || March 19, 1993 || La Silla || UESAC || — || align=right | 3.8 km || 
|-id=602 bgcolor=#fefefe
| 136602 ||  || — || April 19, 1993 || Kitt Peak || Spacewatch || — || align=right | 1.3 km || 
|-id=603 bgcolor=#fefefe
| 136603 ||  || — || August 15, 1993 || Caussols || E. W. Elst || — || align=right | 1.4 km || 
|-id=604 bgcolor=#E9E9E9
| 136604 ||  || — || August 19, 1993 || Palomar || E. F. Helin || JUN || align=right | 5.2 km || 
|-id=605 bgcolor=#E9E9E9
| 136605 ||  || — || September 17, 1993 || La Silla || E. W. Elst || — || align=right | 1.9 km || 
|-id=606 bgcolor=#E9E9E9
| 136606 ||  || — || October 9, 1993 || Kitt Peak || Spacewatch || — || align=right | 2.5 km || 
|-id=607 bgcolor=#E9E9E9
| 136607 ||  || — || October 9, 1993 || La Silla || E. W. Elst || — || align=right | 2.9 km || 
|-id=608 bgcolor=#E9E9E9
| 136608 ||  || — || October 9, 1993 || La Silla || E. W. Elst || JUN || align=right | 1.7 km || 
|-id=609 bgcolor=#E9E9E9
| 136609 ||  || — || October 9, 1993 || La Silla || E. W. Elst || — || align=right | 2.6 km || 
|-id=610 bgcolor=#E9E9E9
| 136610 ||  || — || October 9, 1993 || La Silla || E. W. Elst || HEN || align=right | 1.8 km || 
|-id=611 bgcolor=#E9E9E9
| 136611 ||  || — || October 9, 1993 || La Silla || E. W. Elst || JUN || align=right | 3.3 km || 
|-id=612 bgcolor=#E9E9E9
| 136612 ||  || — || October 9, 1993 || La Silla || E. W. Elst || — || align=right | 2.8 km || 
|-id=613 bgcolor=#E9E9E9
| 136613 ||  || — || October 9, 1993 || La Silla || E. W. Elst || — || align=right | 2.5 km || 
|-id=614 bgcolor=#E9E9E9
| 136614 ||  || — || November 9, 1993 || Kitt Peak || Spacewatch || MRX || align=right | 1.8 km || 
|-id=615 bgcolor=#d6d6d6
| 136615 ||  || — || January 8, 1994 || Kitt Peak || Spacewatch || 7:4 || align=right | 7.3 km || 
|-id=616 bgcolor=#E9E9E9
| 136616 ||  || — || January 11, 1994 || Kitt Peak || Spacewatch || XIZ || align=right | 2.5 km || 
|-id=617 bgcolor=#FFC2E0
| 136617 || 1994 CC || — || February 3, 1994 || Kitt Peak || Spacewatch || APO +1kmPHAmoon || align=right | 1.0 km || 
|-id=618 bgcolor=#FFC2E0
| 136618 ||  || — || February 15, 1994 || Kitt Peak || Spacewatch || APO +1kmPHA || align=right | 1.6 km || 
|-id=619 bgcolor=#fefefe
| 136619 ||  || — || February 8, 1994 || La Silla || E. W. Elst || — || align=right | 1.5 km || 
|-id=620 bgcolor=#B88A00
| 136620 || 1994 JC || — || May 4, 1994 || Palomar || E. F. Helin, K. J. Lawrence || 2:1Junusual || align=right | 5.9 km || 
|-id=621 bgcolor=#d6d6d6
| 136621 ||  || — || May 5, 1994 || Kitt Peak || Spacewatch || — || align=right | 3.9 km || 
|-id=622 bgcolor=#d6d6d6
| 136622 ||  || — || August 10, 1994 || La Silla || E. W. Elst || HYG || align=right | 4.5 km || 
|-id=623 bgcolor=#d6d6d6
| 136623 ||  || — || August 10, 1994 || La Silla || E. W. Elst || HYG || align=right | 4.9 km || 
|-id=624 bgcolor=#d6d6d6
| 136624 ||  || — || August 10, 1994 || La Silla || E. W. Elst || HYG || align=right | 5.9 km || 
|-id=625 bgcolor=#fefefe
| 136625 ||  || — || August 10, 1994 || La Silla || E. W. Elst || — || align=right | 1.5 km || 
|-id=626 bgcolor=#E9E9E9
| 136626 ||  || — || August 12, 1994 || La Silla || E. W. Elst || EUN || align=right | 2.1 km || 
|-id=627 bgcolor=#d6d6d6
| 136627 ||  || — || August 12, 1994 || La Silla || E. W. Elst || — || align=right | 4.7 km || 
|-id=628 bgcolor=#d6d6d6
| 136628 ||  || — || August 12, 1994 || La Silla || E. W. Elst || — || align=right | 6.0 km || 
|-id=629 bgcolor=#fefefe
| 136629 ||  || — || August 12, 1994 || La Silla || E. W. Elst || NYS || align=right | 1.1 km || 
|-id=630 bgcolor=#d6d6d6
| 136630 ||  || — || September 11, 1994 || Kitt Peak || Spacewatch || HYG || align=right | 4.5 km || 
|-id=631 bgcolor=#fefefe
| 136631 ||  || — || September 12, 1994 || Kitt Peak || Spacewatch || NYS || align=right data-sort-value="0.90" | 900 m || 
|-id=632 bgcolor=#fefefe
| 136632 ||  || — || September 28, 1994 || Kitt Peak || Spacewatch || — || align=right | 1.5 km || 
|-id=633 bgcolor=#d6d6d6
| 136633 ||  || — || September 28, 1994 || Kitt Peak || Spacewatch || HYG || align=right | 4.9 km || 
|-id=634 bgcolor=#d6d6d6
| 136634 ||  || — || September 28, 1994 || Kitt Peak || Spacewatch || THM || align=right | 6.5 km || 
|-id=635 bgcolor=#FFC2E0
| 136635 ||  || — || November 5, 1994 || Kitt Peak || Spacewatch || AMO || align=right data-sort-value="0.53" | 530 m || 
|-id=636 bgcolor=#E9E9E9
| 136636 ||  || — || November 5, 1994 || Kitt Peak || Spacewatch || — || align=right | 2.0 km || 
|-id=637 bgcolor=#d6d6d6
| 136637 ||  || — || November 28, 1994 || Kitt Peak || Spacewatch || THM || align=right | 3.8 km || 
|-id=638 bgcolor=#E9E9E9
| 136638 ||  || — || January 25, 1995 || Oizumi || T. Kobayashi || — || align=right | 2.6 km || 
|-id=639 bgcolor=#E9E9E9
| 136639 ||  || — || February 1, 1995 || Kitt Peak || Spacewatch || — || align=right | 2.4 km || 
|-id=640 bgcolor=#E9E9E9
| 136640 ||  || — || February 1, 1995 || Kitt Peak || Spacewatch || — || align=right | 2.4 km || 
|-id=641 bgcolor=#E9E9E9
| 136641 ||  || — || February 1, 1995 || Kitt Peak || Spacewatch || — || align=right | 2.8 km || 
|-id=642 bgcolor=#E9E9E9
| 136642 ||  || — || February 24, 1995 || Kitt Peak || Spacewatch || — || align=right | 1.8 km || 
|-id=643 bgcolor=#E9E9E9
| 136643 ||  || — || March 2, 1995 || Kitt Peak || Spacewatch || — || align=right | 2.1 km || 
|-id=644 bgcolor=#E9E9E9
| 136644 ||  || — || March 26, 1995 || Kitt Peak || Spacewatch || — || align=right | 1.2 km || 
|-id=645 bgcolor=#E9E9E9
| 136645 ||  || — || March 27, 1995 || Kitt Peak || Spacewatch || — || align=right | 3.5 km || 
|-id=646 bgcolor=#E9E9E9
| 136646 ||  || — || March 27, 1995 || Kitt Peak || Spacewatch || NEM || align=right | 3.8 km || 
|-id=647 bgcolor=#fefefe
| 136647 ||  || — || March 28, 1995 || Kitt Peak || Spacewatch || V || align=right data-sort-value="0.83" | 830 m || 
|-id=648 bgcolor=#E9E9E9
| 136648 ||  || — || April 2, 1995 || Kitt Peak || Spacewatch || — || align=right | 2.1 km || 
|-id=649 bgcolor=#E9E9E9
| 136649 ||  || — || April 4, 1995 || Kitt Peak || Spacewatch || — || align=right | 2.8 km || 
|-id=650 bgcolor=#E9E9E9
| 136650 ||  || — || April 25, 1995 || Kitt Peak || Spacewatch || — || align=right | 3.7 km || 
|-id=651 bgcolor=#E9E9E9
| 136651 ||  || — || April 26, 1995 || Kitt Peak || Spacewatch || — || align=right | 3.9 km || 
|-id=652 bgcolor=#E9E9E9
| 136652 ||  || — || June 22, 1995 || Kitt Peak || Spacewatch || GEF || align=right | 2.3 km || 
|-id=653 bgcolor=#d6d6d6
| 136653 ||  || — || June 23, 1995 || Kitt Peak || Spacewatch || 615 || align=right | 2.9 km || 
|-id=654 bgcolor=#fefefe
| 136654 ||  || — || June 23, 1995 || Kitt Peak || Spacewatch || — || align=right | 1.3 km || 
|-id=655 bgcolor=#fefefe
| 136655 ||  || — || June 30, 1995 || Kitt Peak || Spacewatch || V || align=right | 1.2 km || 
|-id=656 bgcolor=#fefefe
| 136656 ||  || — || July 22, 1995 || Kitt Peak || Spacewatch || V || align=right data-sort-value="0.78" | 780 m || 
|-id=657 bgcolor=#d6d6d6
| 136657 ||  || — || July 22, 1995 || Kitt Peak || Spacewatch || — || align=right | 3.7 km || 
|-id=658 bgcolor=#fefefe
| 136658 ||  || — || July 24, 1995 || Kitt Peak || Spacewatch || FLO || align=right | 1.9 km || 
|-id=659 bgcolor=#fefefe
| 136659 ||  || — || July 25, 1995 || Kitt Peak || Spacewatch || V || align=right | 1.1 km || 
|-id=660 bgcolor=#fefefe
| 136660 ||  || — || July 27, 1995 || Kitt Peak || Spacewatch || — || align=right | 1.3 km || 
|-id=661 bgcolor=#fefefe
| 136661 ||  || — || July 26, 1995 || Kitt Peak || Spacewatch || MAS || align=right data-sort-value="0.99" | 990 m || 
|-id=662 bgcolor=#fefefe
| 136662 ||  || — || August 17, 1995 || Kitt Peak || Spacewatch || — || align=right | 1.5 km || 
|-id=663 bgcolor=#d6d6d6
| 136663 ||  || — || August 22, 1995 || Kitt Peak || Spacewatch || EOS || align=right | 3.0 km || 
|-id=664 bgcolor=#d6d6d6
| 136664 ||  || — || August 22, 1995 || Kitt Peak || Spacewatch || HYG || align=right | 4.2 km || 
|-id=665 bgcolor=#d6d6d6
| 136665 ||  || — || August 28, 1995 || Kitt Peak || Spacewatch || — || align=right | 3.1 km || 
|-id=666 bgcolor=#fefefe
| 136666 Seidel || 1995 SE ||  || September 17, 1995 || Kleť || M. Tichý, J. Tichá || NYS || align=right | 1.1 km || 
|-id=667 bgcolor=#d6d6d6
| 136667 ||  || — || September 17, 1995 || Kitt Peak || Spacewatch || — || align=right | 4.2 km || 
|-id=668 bgcolor=#fefefe
| 136668 ||  || — || September 17, 1995 || Kitt Peak || Spacewatch || MAS || align=right data-sort-value="0.72" | 720 m || 
|-id=669 bgcolor=#fefefe
| 136669 ||  || — || September 17, 1995 || Kitt Peak || Spacewatch || NYS || align=right | 1.2 km || 
|-id=670 bgcolor=#d6d6d6
| 136670 ||  || — || September 18, 1995 || Kitt Peak || Spacewatch || — || align=right | 7.4 km || 
|-id=671 bgcolor=#d6d6d6
| 136671 ||  || — || September 18, 1995 || Kitt Peak || Spacewatch || — || align=right | 6.3 km || 
|-id=672 bgcolor=#d6d6d6
| 136672 ||  || — || September 18, 1995 || Kitt Peak || Spacewatch || — || align=right | 3.5 km || 
|-id=673 bgcolor=#fefefe
| 136673 ||  || — || September 18, 1995 || Kitt Peak || Spacewatch || — || align=right data-sort-value="0.88" | 880 m || 
|-id=674 bgcolor=#d6d6d6
| 136674 ||  || — || September 18, 1995 || Kitt Peak || Spacewatch || — || align=right | 4.0 km || 
|-id=675 bgcolor=#fefefe
| 136675 ||  || — || September 19, 1995 || Kitt Peak || Spacewatch || MAS || align=right | 1.2 km || 
|-id=676 bgcolor=#fefefe
| 136676 ||  || — || September 19, 1995 || Kitt Peak || Spacewatch || EUT || align=right | 1.0 km || 
|-id=677 bgcolor=#fefefe
| 136677 ||  || — || September 19, 1995 || Kitt Peak || Spacewatch || V || align=right | 1.0 km || 
|-id=678 bgcolor=#fefefe
| 136678 ||  || — || September 19, 1995 || Kitt Peak || Spacewatch || — || align=right | 1.2 km || 
|-id=679 bgcolor=#fefefe
| 136679 ||  || — || September 19, 1995 || Kitt Peak || Spacewatch || — || align=right | 1.7 km || 
|-id=680 bgcolor=#d6d6d6
| 136680 ||  || — || September 19, 1995 || Kitt Peak || Spacewatch || THM || align=right | 3.4 km || 
|-id=681 bgcolor=#d6d6d6
| 136681 ||  || — || September 20, 1995 || Kitt Peak || Spacewatch || THM || align=right | 3.2 km || 
|-id=682 bgcolor=#fefefe
| 136682 ||  || — || September 20, 1995 || Kitt Peak || Spacewatch || — || align=right | 1.1 km || 
|-id=683 bgcolor=#fefefe
| 136683 ||  || — || September 22, 1995 || Kitt Peak || Spacewatch || MAS || align=right data-sort-value="0.81" | 810 m || 
|-id=684 bgcolor=#d6d6d6
| 136684 ||  || — || September 22, 1995 || Kitt Peak || Spacewatch || — || align=right | 6.3 km || 
|-id=685 bgcolor=#d6d6d6
| 136685 ||  || — || September 22, 1995 || Kitt Peak || Spacewatch || — || align=right | 3.6 km || 
|-id=686 bgcolor=#fefefe
| 136686 ||  || — || September 23, 1995 || Kitt Peak || Spacewatch || — || align=right data-sort-value="0.98" | 980 m || 
|-id=687 bgcolor=#fefefe
| 136687 ||  || — || September 23, 1995 || Kitt Peak || Spacewatch || — || align=right data-sort-value="0.87" | 870 m || 
|-id=688 bgcolor=#d6d6d6
| 136688 ||  || — || September 24, 1995 || Kitt Peak || Spacewatch || KOR || align=right | 2.3 km || 
|-id=689 bgcolor=#fefefe
| 136689 ||  || — || September 24, 1995 || Kitt Peak || Spacewatch || — || align=right data-sort-value="0.94" | 940 m || 
|-id=690 bgcolor=#fefefe
| 136690 ||  || — || September 25, 1995 || Kitt Peak || Spacewatch || MAS || align=right | 1.1 km || 
|-id=691 bgcolor=#d6d6d6
| 136691 ||  || — || September 25, 1995 || Kitt Peak || Spacewatch || — || align=right | 4.8 km || 
|-id=692 bgcolor=#d6d6d6
| 136692 ||  || — || September 25, 1995 || Kitt Peak || Spacewatch || THM || align=right | 2.5 km || 
|-id=693 bgcolor=#fefefe
| 136693 ||  || — || September 25, 1995 || Kitt Peak || Spacewatch || — || align=right data-sort-value="0.87" | 870 m || 
|-id=694 bgcolor=#fefefe
| 136694 ||  || — || September 25, 1995 || Kitt Peak || Spacewatch || — || align=right data-sort-value="0.91" | 910 m || 
|-id=695 bgcolor=#fefefe
| 136695 ||  || — || September 26, 1995 || Kitt Peak || Spacewatch || — || align=right | 1.4 km || 
|-id=696 bgcolor=#fefefe
| 136696 ||  || — || September 26, 1995 || Kitt Peak || Spacewatch || MAS || align=right data-sort-value="0.88" | 880 m || 
|-id=697 bgcolor=#fefefe
| 136697 ||  || — || September 25, 1995 || Kitt Peak || Spacewatch || NYS || align=right | 1.1 km || 
|-id=698 bgcolor=#FA8072
| 136698 ||  || — || September 25, 1995 || Kitt Peak || Spacewatch || — || align=right | 1.1 km || 
|-id=699 bgcolor=#d6d6d6
| 136699 ||  || — || September 18, 1995 || Kitt Peak || Spacewatch || TIR || align=right | 6.5 km || 
|-id=700 bgcolor=#fefefe
| 136700 ||  || — || September 21, 1995 || Kitt Peak || Spacewatch || — || align=right | 1.1 km || 
|}

136701–136800 

|-bgcolor=#d6d6d6
| 136701 ||  || — || September 21, 1995 || Kitt Peak || Spacewatch || — || align=right | 5.1 km || 
|-id=702 bgcolor=#d6d6d6
| 136702 ||  || — || September 25, 1995 || Kitt Peak || Spacewatch || — || align=right | 2.6 km || 
|-id=703 bgcolor=#d6d6d6
| 136703 ||  || — || September 26, 1995 || Kitt Peak || Spacewatch || HYG || align=right | 2.8 km || 
|-id=704 bgcolor=#d6d6d6
| 136704 || 1995 TW || — || October 13, 1995 || Kitt Peak || T. B. Spahr || — || align=right | 5.2 km || 
|-id=705 bgcolor=#fefefe
| 136705 ||  || — || October 14, 1995 || Xinglong || SCAP || FLO || align=right | 1.2 km || 
|-id=706 bgcolor=#d6d6d6
| 136706 ||  || — || October 15, 1995 || Kitt Peak || Spacewatch || — || align=right | 2.9 km || 
|-id=707 bgcolor=#d6d6d6
| 136707 ||  || — || October 15, 1995 || Kitt Peak || Spacewatch || — || align=right | 5.5 km || 
|-id=708 bgcolor=#fefefe
| 136708 ||  || — || October 15, 1995 || Kitt Peak || Spacewatch || — || align=right | 1.8 km || 
|-id=709 bgcolor=#fefefe
| 136709 ||  || — || October 1, 1995 || Kitt Peak || Spacewatch || — || align=right | 1.1 km || 
|-id=710 bgcolor=#fefefe
| 136710 ||  || — || October 17, 1995 || Kitt Peak || Spacewatch || NYS || align=right | 1.0 km || 
|-id=711 bgcolor=#fefefe
| 136711 ||  || — || October 17, 1995 || Kitt Peak || Spacewatch || NYS || align=right data-sort-value="0.96" | 960 m || 
|-id=712 bgcolor=#d6d6d6
| 136712 ||  || — || October 17, 1995 || Kitt Peak || Spacewatch || — || align=right | 5.7 km || 
|-id=713 bgcolor=#fefefe
| 136713 ||  || — || October 17, 1995 || Kitt Peak || Spacewatch || NYS || align=right | 1.3 km || 
|-id=714 bgcolor=#fefefe
| 136714 ||  || — || October 17, 1995 || Kitt Peak || Spacewatch || V || align=right | 1.1 km || 
|-id=715 bgcolor=#d6d6d6
| 136715 ||  || — || October 17, 1995 || Kitt Peak || Spacewatch || — || align=right | 5.2 km || 
|-id=716 bgcolor=#fefefe
| 136716 ||  || — || October 17, 1995 || Kitt Peak || Spacewatch || V || align=right data-sort-value="0.97" | 970 m || 
|-id=717 bgcolor=#fefefe
| 136717 ||  || — || October 17, 1995 || Kitt Peak || Spacewatch || NYS || align=right | 1.2 km || 
|-id=718 bgcolor=#d6d6d6
| 136718 ||  || — || October 18, 1995 || Kitt Peak || Spacewatch || — || align=right | 5.1 km || 
|-id=719 bgcolor=#fefefe
| 136719 ||  || — || October 18, 1995 || Kitt Peak || Spacewatch || V || align=right data-sort-value="0.98" | 980 m || 
|-id=720 bgcolor=#d6d6d6
| 136720 ||  || — || October 19, 1995 || Kitt Peak || Spacewatch || — || align=right | 3.6 km || 
|-id=721 bgcolor=#fefefe
| 136721 ||  || — || October 19, 1995 || Kitt Peak || Spacewatch || — || align=right | 1.5 km || 
|-id=722 bgcolor=#d6d6d6
| 136722 ||  || — || October 20, 1995 || Kitt Peak || Spacewatch || EOS || align=right | 2.6 km || 
|-id=723 bgcolor=#fefefe
| 136723 ||  || — || October 20, 1995 || Kitt Peak || Spacewatch || NYS || align=right | 1.0 km || 
|-id=724 bgcolor=#d6d6d6
| 136724 ||  || — || October 21, 1995 || Kitt Peak || Spacewatch || LIX || align=right | 6.1 km || 
|-id=725 bgcolor=#d6d6d6
| 136725 ||  || — || October 23, 1995 || Kitt Peak || Spacewatch || — || align=right | 5.9 km || 
|-id=726 bgcolor=#d6d6d6
| 136726 ||  || — || October 23, 1995 || Kitt Peak || Spacewatch || EOS || align=right | 3.0 km || 
|-id=727 bgcolor=#fefefe
| 136727 ||  || — || October 19, 1995 || Kitt Peak || Spacewatch || NYS || align=right data-sort-value="0.87" | 870 m || 
|-id=728 bgcolor=#d6d6d6
| 136728 ||  || — || October 23, 1995 || Kitt Peak || Spacewatch || — || align=right | 5.2 km || 
|-id=729 bgcolor=#d6d6d6
| 136729 ||  || — || October 17, 1995 || Kitt Peak || Spacewatch || fast? || align=right | 3.5 km || 
|-id=730 bgcolor=#fefefe
| 136730 ||  || — || October 18, 1995 || Kitt Peak || Spacewatch || NYS || align=right data-sort-value="0.98" | 980 m || 
|-id=731 bgcolor=#fefefe
| 136731 ||  || — || October 19, 1995 || Kitt Peak || Spacewatch || MAS || align=right data-sort-value="0.96" | 960 m || 
|-id=732 bgcolor=#d6d6d6
| 136732 ||  || — || October 24, 1995 || Kitt Peak || Spacewatch || VER || align=right | 5.9 km || 
|-id=733 bgcolor=#d6d6d6
| 136733 ||  || — || October 24, 1995 || Kitt Peak || Spacewatch || — || align=right | 3.9 km || 
|-id=734 bgcolor=#fefefe
| 136734 ||  || — || November 14, 1995 || Kitt Peak || Spacewatch || — || align=right | 1.2 km || 
|-id=735 bgcolor=#d6d6d6
| 136735 ||  || — || November 15, 1995 || Kitt Peak || Spacewatch || — || align=right | 4.7 km || 
|-id=736 bgcolor=#d6d6d6
| 136736 ||  || — || November 15, 1995 || Kitt Peak || Spacewatch || HYG || align=right | 5.5 km || 
|-id=737 bgcolor=#fefefe
| 136737 ||  || — || November 15, 1995 || Kitt Peak || Spacewatch || NYS || align=right | 1.3 km || 
|-id=738 bgcolor=#fefefe
| 136738 ||  || — || November 15, 1995 || Kitt Peak || Spacewatch || — || align=right | 1.6 km || 
|-id=739 bgcolor=#d6d6d6
| 136739 ||  || — || November 15, 1995 || Kitt Peak || Spacewatch || — || align=right | 5.4 km || 
|-id=740 bgcolor=#d6d6d6
| 136740 ||  || — || November 15, 1995 || Kitt Peak || Spacewatch || HYG || align=right | 3.9 km || 
|-id=741 bgcolor=#fefefe
| 136741 ||  || — || November 15, 1995 || Kitt Peak || Spacewatch || NYS || align=right | 1.3 km || 
|-id=742 bgcolor=#d6d6d6
| 136742 ||  || — || November 15, 1995 || Kitt Peak || Spacewatch || — || align=right | 3.9 km || 
|-id=743 bgcolor=#fefefe
| 136743 Echigo ||  ||  || November 16, 1995 || Chichibu || N. Satō, T. Urata || NYS || align=right | 1.1 km || 
|-id=744 bgcolor=#fefefe
| 136744 ||  || — || November 27, 1995 || Oizumi || T. Kobayashi || NYS || align=right | 1.1 km || 
|-id=745 bgcolor=#FFC2E0
| 136745 ||  || — || November 29, 1995 || Caussols || C. Pollas || AMO +1km || align=right data-sort-value="0.88" | 880 m || 
|-id=746 bgcolor=#d6d6d6
| 136746 ||  || — || November 17, 1995 || Kitt Peak || Spacewatch || HYG || align=right | 3.4 km || 
|-id=747 bgcolor=#d6d6d6
| 136747 ||  || — || November 17, 1995 || Kitt Peak || Spacewatch || HYG || align=right | 4.4 km || 
|-id=748 bgcolor=#fefefe
| 136748 ||  || — || November 18, 1995 || Kitt Peak || Spacewatch || V || align=right | 1.1 km || 
|-id=749 bgcolor=#fefefe
| 136749 ||  || — || November 18, 1995 || Kitt Peak || Spacewatch || MAS || align=right data-sort-value="0.98" | 980 m || 
|-id=750 bgcolor=#E9E9E9
| 136750 ||  || — || December 16, 1995 || Kitt Peak || Spacewatch || — || align=right | 1.8 km || 
|-id=751 bgcolor=#d6d6d6
| 136751 ||  || — || December 16, 1995 || Kitt Peak || Spacewatch || — || align=right | 5.6 km || 
|-id=752 bgcolor=#fefefe
| 136752 ||  || — || December 18, 1995 || Kitt Peak || Spacewatch || — || align=right | 1.3 km || 
|-id=753 bgcolor=#d6d6d6
| 136753 ||  || — || December 22, 1995 || Kitt Peak || Spacewatch || HYG || align=right | 3.8 km || 
|-id=754 bgcolor=#fefefe
| 136754 ||  || — || January 12, 1996 || Kitt Peak || Spacewatch || NYS || align=right | 1.2 km || 
|-id=755 bgcolor=#E9E9E9
| 136755 ||  || — || January 13, 1996 || Kitt Peak || Spacewatch || RAF || align=right | 1.9 km || 
|-id=756 bgcolor=#fefefe
| 136756 ||  || — || January 14, 1996 || Kitt Peak || Spacewatch || — || align=right | 1.2 km || 
|-id=757 bgcolor=#E9E9E9
| 136757 ||  || — || January 20, 1996 || Kitt Peak || Spacewatch || ADE || align=right | 3.7 km || 
|-id=758 bgcolor=#E9E9E9
| 136758 ||  || — || March 11, 1996 || Kitt Peak || Spacewatch || — || align=right | 1.9 km || 
|-id=759 bgcolor=#E9E9E9
| 136759 ||  || — || March 20, 1996 || Haleakala || NEAT || — || align=right | 4.4 km || 
|-id=760 bgcolor=#E9E9E9
| 136760 ||  || — || March 20, 1996 || Kitt Peak || Spacewatch || — || align=right | 1.5 km || 
|-id=761 bgcolor=#d6d6d6
| 136761 ||  || — || April 12, 1996 || Kitt Peak || Spacewatch || 615 || align=right | 3.2 km || 
|-id=762 bgcolor=#E9E9E9
| 136762 ||  || — || April 14, 1996 || Kitt Peak || Spacewatch || MAR || align=right | 2.1 km || 
|-id=763 bgcolor=#E9E9E9
| 136763 ||  || — || April 18, 1996 || Kitt Peak || Spacewatch || — || align=right | 1.3 km || 
|-id=764 bgcolor=#E9E9E9
| 136764 ||  || — || April 20, 1996 || La Silla || E. W. Elst || — || align=right | 2.1 km || 
|-id=765 bgcolor=#E9E9E9
| 136765 || 1996 JA || — || May 5, 1996 || Modra || A. Galád, A. Pravda || — || align=right | 2.6 km || 
|-id=766 bgcolor=#E9E9E9
| 136766 ||  || — || May 9, 1996 || Kitt Peak || Spacewatch || — || align=right | 3.7 km || 
|-id=767 bgcolor=#E9E9E9
| 136767 ||  || — || May 12, 1996 || Kitt Peak || Spacewatch || — || align=right | 2.9 km || 
|-id=768 bgcolor=#E9E9E9
| 136768 ||  || — || May 13, 1996 || Kitt Peak || Spacewatch || — || align=right | 2.2 km || 
|-id=769 bgcolor=#E9E9E9
| 136769 || 1996 OD || — || July 18, 1996 || Prescott || P. G. Comba || — || align=right | 3.4 km || 
|-id=770 bgcolor=#FFC2E0
| 136770 ||  || — || August 11, 1996 || Siding Spring || R. H. McNaught || APOcritical || align=right data-sort-value="0.27" | 270 m || 
|-id=771 bgcolor=#fefefe
| 136771 ||  || — || August 13, 1996 || Haleakala || NEAT || — || align=right | 1.5 km || 
|-id=772 bgcolor=#E9E9E9
| 136772 ||  || — || September 14, 1996 || Kitt Peak || Spacewatch || AST || align=right | 4.1 km || 
|-id=773 bgcolor=#FFC2E0
| 136773 ||  || — || October 9, 1996 || Kitt Peak || Spacewatch || AMO || align=right data-sort-value="0.67" | 670 m || 
|-id=774 bgcolor=#E9E9E9
| 136774 ||  || — || October 3, 1996 || Xinglong || SCAP || AST || align=right | 2.4 km || 
|-id=775 bgcolor=#d6d6d6
| 136775 ||  || — || October 5, 1996 || Kitt Peak || Spacewatch || — || align=right | 3.3 km || 
|-id=776 bgcolor=#fefefe
| 136776 ||  || — || October 6, 1996 || Kitt Peak || Spacewatch || — || align=right data-sort-value="0.96" | 960 m || 
|-id=777 bgcolor=#d6d6d6
| 136777 ||  || — || October 7, 1996 || Kitt Peak || Spacewatch || — || align=right | 6.2 km || 
|-id=778 bgcolor=#d6d6d6
| 136778 ||  || — || October 12, 1996 || Kitt Peak || Spacewatch || KOR || align=right | 2.0 km || 
|-id=779 bgcolor=#fefefe
| 136779 ||  || — || October 8, 1996 || La Silla || C.-I. Lagerkvist || — || align=right | 2.2 km || 
|-id=780 bgcolor=#fefefe
| 136780 ||  || — || November 4, 1996 || Kitt Peak || Spacewatch || — || align=right | 1.8 km || 
|-id=781 bgcolor=#d6d6d6
| 136781 ||  || — || November 6, 1996 || Kitt Peak || Spacewatch || KOR || align=right | 2.4 km || 
|-id=782 bgcolor=#fefefe
| 136782 ||  || — || November 11, 1996 || Kitt Peak || Spacewatch || FLO || align=right data-sort-value="0.96" | 960 m || 
|-id=783 bgcolor=#d6d6d6
| 136783 ||  || — || November 11, 1996 || Kitt Peak || Spacewatch || — || align=right | 3.6 km || 
|-id=784 bgcolor=#d6d6d6
| 136784 ||  || — || November 30, 1996 || Oizumi || T. Kobayashi || — || align=right | 5.2 km || 
|-id=785 bgcolor=#fefefe
| 136785 ||  || — || December 3, 1996 || Prescott || P. G. Comba || V || align=right | 1.2 km || 
|-id=786 bgcolor=#fefefe
| 136786 ||  || — || December 6, 1996 || Kitt Peak || Spacewatch || — || align=right | 1.5 km || 
|-id=787 bgcolor=#fefefe
| 136787 ||  || — || December 1, 1996 || Kitt Peak || Spacewatch || — || align=right | 1.5 km || 
|-id=788 bgcolor=#fefefe
| 136788 ||  || — || December 2, 1996 || Kitt Peak || Spacewatch || — || align=right | 1.4 km || 
|-id=789 bgcolor=#fefefe
| 136789 ||  || — || December 4, 1996 || Kitt Peak || Spacewatch || — || align=right | 1.9 km || 
|-id=790 bgcolor=#fefefe
| 136790 ||  || — || December 29, 1996 || Chichibu || N. Satō || — || align=right | 1.5 km || 
|-id=791 bgcolor=#d6d6d6
| 136791 ||  || — || January 2, 1997 || Kitt Peak || Spacewatch || — || align=right | 3.6 km || 
|-id=792 bgcolor=#d6d6d6
| 136792 ||  || — || January 14, 1997 || Oizumi || T. Kobayashi || Tj (2.92) || align=right | 6.7 km || 
|-id=793 bgcolor=#FFC2E0
| 136793 ||  || — || January 15, 1997 || Farra d'Isonzo || Farra d'Isonzo || APO || align=right data-sort-value="0.78" | 780 m || 
|-id=794 bgcolor=#fefefe
| 136794 ||  || — || January 10, 1997 || Kitt Peak || Spacewatch || — || align=right | 1.5 km || 
|-id=795 bgcolor=#FFC2E0
| 136795 Tatsunokingo || 1997 BQ ||  || January 16, 1997 || Kiso || T. Hasegawa || APO +1kmPHA || align=right data-sort-value="0.83" | 830 m || 
|-id=796 bgcolor=#E9E9E9
| 136796 ||  || — || January 30, 1997 || Goodricke-Pigott || R. A. Tucker || — || align=right | 4.1 km || 
|-id=797 bgcolor=#fefefe
| 136797 ||  || — || February 1, 1997 || Oizumi || T. Kobayashi || — || align=right | 1.3 km || 
|-id=798 bgcolor=#fefefe
| 136798 ||  || — || February 2, 1997 || Kitt Peak || Spacewatch || — || align=right | 1.4 km || 
|-id=799 bgcolor=#fefefe
| 136799 ||  || — || February 6, 1997 || Prescott || P. G. Comba || — || align=right | 1.1 km || 
|-id=800 bgcolor=#d6d6d6
| 136800 ||  || — || February 4, 1997 || Kitt Peak || Spacewatch || — || align=right | 5.0 km || 
|}

136801–136900 

|-bgcolor=#fefefe
| 136801 ||  || — || February 3, 1997 || Kitt Peak || Spacewatch || NYS || align=right data-sort-value="0.99" | 990 m || 
|-id=802 bgcolor=#fefefe
| 136802 ||  || — || February 15, 1997 || Kitt Peak || Spacewatch || — || align=right | 2.1 km || 
|-id=803 bgcolor=#fefefe
| 136803 Calliemorgan ||  ||  || March 6, 1997 || Chinle || J. Bruton || — || align=right | 2.4 km || 
|-id=804 bgcolor=#fefefe
| 136804 ||  || — || March 4, 1997 || Kitt Peak || Spacewatch || — || align=right | 1.4 km || 
|-id=805 bgcolor=#fefefe
| 136805 ||  || — || March 13, 1997 || Kitt Peak || Spacewatch || — || align=right | 1.8 km || 
|-id=806 bgcolor=#fefefe
| 136806 ||  || — || March 11, 1997 || Kitt Peak || Spacewatch || MAS || align=right | 1.0 km || 
|-id=807 bgcolor=#d6d6d6
| 136807 ||  || — || March 5, 1997 || Socorro || LINEAR || — || align=right | 6.6 km || 
|-id=808 bgcolor=#fefefe
| 136808 ||  || — || March 12, 1997 || La Silla || E. W. Elst || NYS || align=right | 1.2 km || 
|-id=809 bgcolor=#fefefe
| 136809 ||  || — || April 2, 1997 || Kitt Peak || Spacewatch || — || align=right | 1.2 km || 
|-id=810 bgcolor=#fefefe
| 136810 ||  || — || April 3, 1997 || Socorro || LINEAR || H || align=right data-sort-value="0.96" | 960 m || 
|-id=811 bgcolor=#fefefe
| 136811 ||  || — || April 3, 1997 || Socorro || LINEAR || V || align=right | 1.2 km || 
|-id=812 bgcolor=#fefefe
| 136812 ||  || — || April 3, 1997 || Socorro || LINEAR || NYS || align=right | 1.0 km || 
|-id=813 bgcolor=#fefefe
| 136813 ||  || — || April 6, 1997 || Socorro || LINEAR || NYS || align=right | 1.2 km || 
|-id=814 bgcolor=#fefefe
| 136814 ||  || — || April 30, 1997 || Kitt Peak || Spacewatch || MAS || align=right | 1.0 km || 
|-id=815 bgcolor=#fefefe
| 136815 ||  || — || April 27, 1997 || Kitt Peak || Spacewatch || — || align=right | 1.5 km || 
|-id=816 bgcolor=#E9E9E9
| 136816 ||  || — || April 30, 1997 || Socorro || LINEAR || — || align=right | 1.7 km || 
|-id=817 bgcolor=#E9E9E9
| 136817 ||  || — || May 1, 1997 || Kitt Peak || Spacewatch || — || align=right | 2.2 km || 
|-id=818 bgcolor=#FFC2E0
| 136818 Selqet ||  ||  || June 29, 1997 || Goodricke-Pigott || R. A. Tucker || ATE || align=right data-sort-value="0.57" | 570 m || 
|-id=819 bgcolor=#E9E9E9
| 136819 ||  || — || June 26, 1997 || Kitt Peak || Spacewatch || BRG || align=right | 2.2 km || 
|-id=820 bgcolor=#E9E9E9
| 136820 ||  || — || June 30, 1997 || Kitt Peak || Spacewatch || — || align=right | 1.9 km || 
|-id=821 bgcolor=#E9E9E9
| 136821 ||  || — || July 6, 1997 || Kitt Peak || Spacewatch || — || align=right | 1.6 km || 
|-id=822 bgcolor=#d6d6d6
| 136822 ||  || — || August 10, 1997 || Modra || A. Galád, A. Pravda || 3:2 || align=right | 7.5 km || 
|-id=823 bgcolor=#E9E9E9
| 136823 || 1997 QR || — || August 26, 1997 || Ondřejov || L. Kotková || — || align=right | 2.5 km || 
|-id=824 bgcolor=#E9E9E9
| 136824 Nonamikeiko ||  ||  || September 8, 1997 || Yatsuka || H. Abe || MRX || align=right | 2.1 km || 
|-id=825 bgcolor=#E9E9E9
| 136825 Slawitschek ||  ||  || September 26, 1997 || Kleť || J. Tichá, M. Tichý || — || align=right | 2.0 km || 
|-id=826 bgcolor=#E9E9E9
| 136826 ||  || — || September 27, 1997 || Oizumi || T. Kobayashi || — || align=right | 2.0 km || 
|-id=827 bgcolor=#E9E9E9
| 136827 ||  || — || September 29, 1997 || Kitt Peak || Spacewatch || — || align=right | 1.7 km || 
|-id=828 bgcolor=#E9E9E9
| 136828 ||  || — || September 29, 1997 || Kitt Peak || Spacewatch || — || align=right | 2.1 km || 
|-id=829 bgcolor=#E9E9E9
| 136829 ||  || — || September 30, 1997 || Uenohara || S. Ueda, H. Kaneda || — || align=right | 5.0 km || 
|-id=830 bgcolor=#E9E9E9
| 136830 ||  || — || September 27, 1997 || Kitt Peak || Spacewatch || — || align=right | 2.8 km || 
|-id=831 bgcolor=#E9E9E9
| 136831 ||  || — || October 3, 1997 || Caussols || ODAS || — || align=right | 1.9 km || 
|-id=832 bgcolor=#E9E9E9
| 136832 ||  || — || October 4, 1997 || Caussols || ODAS || NEM || align=right | 4.1 km || 
|-id=833 bgcolor=#fefefe
| 136833 || 1997 UP || — || October 19, 1997 || Kleť || Kleť Obs. || — || align=right | 1.3 km || 
|-id=834 bgcolor=#E9E9E9
| 136834 ||  || — || October 21, 1997 || Ondřejov || P. Pravec || — || align=right | 2.0 km || 
|-id=835 bgcolor=#d6d6d6
| 136835 ||  || — || October 28, 1997 || Kitt Peak || Spacewatch || 3:2 || align=right | 6.3 km || 
|-id=836 bgcolor=#E9E9E9
| 136836 ||  || — || November 8, 1997 || Oizumi || T. Kobayashi || JUN || align=right | 3.2 km || 
|-id=837 bgcolor=#E9E9E9
| 136837 ||  || — || November 2, 1997 || Xinglong || SCAP || — || align=right | 2.7 km || 
|-id=838 bgcolor=#d6d6d6
| 136838 ||  || — || November 28, 1997 || Xinglong || SCAP || BRA || align=right | 3.1 km || 
|-id=839 bgcolor=#FFC2E0
| 136839 ||  || — || November 29, 1997 || Socorro || LINEAR || AMO || align=right data-sort-value="0.62" | 620 m || 
|-id=840 bgcolor=#E9E9E9
| 136840 ||  || — || November 30, 1997 || Kitt Peak || Spacewatch || GAL || align=right | 2.8 km || 
|-id=841 bgcolor=#E9E9E9
| 136841 ||  || — || November 29, 1997 || Socorro || LINEAR || — || align=right | 2.2 km || 
|-id=842 bgcolor=#E9E9E9
| 136842 ||  || — || December 6, 1997 || Goodricke-Pigott || R. A. Tucker || HNS || align=right | 2.4 km || 
|-id=843 bgcolor=#d6d6d6
| 136843 ||  || — || December 25, 1997 || Oizumi || T. Kobayashi || TRP || align=right | 5.9 km || 
|-id=844 bgcolor=#E9E9E9
| 136844 ||  || — || December 25, 1997 || Haleakala || NEAT || — || align=right | 3.5 km || 
|-id=845 bgcolor=#E9E9E9
| 136845 ||  || — || December 28, 1997 || Kitt Peak || Spacewatch || — || align=right | 2.3 km || 
|-id=846 bgcolor=#fefefe
| 136846 ||  || — || December 28, 1997 || Kitt Peak || Spacewatch || — || align=right | 1.4 km || 
|-id=847 bgcolor=#d6d6d6
| 136847 ||  || — || January 20, 1998 || Nachi-Katsuura || Y. Shimizu, T. Urata || — || align=right | 4.7 km || 
|-id=848 bgcolor=#E9E9E9
| 136848 Kevanpooler ||  ||  || January 25, 1998 || Cima Ekar || U. Munari, M. Tombelli || — || align=right | 4.7 km || 
|-id=849 bgcolor=#FFC2E0
| 136849 ||  || — || February 9, 1998 || Xinglong || SCAP || APO +1kmPHA || align=right | 1.0 km || 
|-id=850 bgcolor=#E9E9E9
| 136850 ||  || — || February 17, 1998 || Xinglong || SCAP || — || align=right | 5.2 km || 
|-id=851 bgcolor=#d6d6d6
| 136851 ||  || — || February 23, 1998 || Kitt Peak || Spacewatch || KOR || align=right | 2.2 km || 
|-id=852 bgcolor=#fefefe
| 136852 ||  || — || February 24, 1998 || Kitt Peak || Spacewatch || — || align=right | 1.3 km || 
|-id=853 bgcolor=#fefefe
| 136853 ||  || — || February 24, 1998 || Kitt Peak || Spacewatch || — || align=right data-sort-value="0.99" | 990 m || 
|-id=854 bgcolor=#fefefe
| 136854 ||  || — || February 26, 1998 || Kitt Peak || Spacewatch || — || align=right | 1.3 km || 
|-id=855 bgcolor=#d6d6d6
| 136855 ||  || — || March 1, 1998 || Kitt Peak || Spacewatch || — || align=right | 4.5 km || 
|-id=856 bgcolor=#d6d6d6
| 136856 ||  || — || March 18, 1998 || Kitt Peak || Spacewatch || — || align=right | 4.7 km || 
|-id=857 bgcolor=#d6d6d6
| 136857 ||  || — || March 20, 1998 || Kitt Peak || Spacewatch || — || align=right | 4.1 km || 
|-id=858 bgcolor=#fefefe
| 136858 ||  || — || March 24, 1998 || Caussols || ODAS || — || align=right | 1.1 km || 
|-id=859 bgcolor=#fefefe
| 136859 ||  || — || March 20, 1998 || Socorro || LINEAR || FLO || align=right | 1.3 km || 
|-id=860 bgcolor=#E9E9E9
| 136860 ||  || — || March 20, 1998 || Socorro || LINEAR || — || align=right | 4.2 km || 
|-id=861 bgcolor=#fefefe
| 136861 ||  || — || March 20, 1998 || Socorro || LINEAR || — || align=right | 2.5 km || 
|-id=862 bgcolor=#fefefe
| 136862 ||  || — || March 20, 1998 || Socorro || LINEAR || ERI || align=right | 3.0 km || 
|-id=863 bgcolor=#fefefe
| 136863 ||  || — || March 20, 1998 || Socorro || LINEAR || FLO || align=right | 1.3 km || 
|-id=864 bgcolor=#FA8072
| 136864 ||  || — || March 20, 1998 || Socorro || LINEAR || — || align=right | 1.6 km || 
|-id=865 bgcolor=#fefefe
| 136865 ||  || — || March 20, 1998 || Socorro || LINEAR || — || align=right | 1.7 km || 
|-id=866 bgcolor=#d6d6d6
| 136866 ||  || — || March 20, 1998 || Socorro || LINEAR || — || align=right | 4.7 km || 
|-id=867 bgcolor=#d6d6d6
| 136867 ||  || — || March 20, 1998 || Socorro || LINEAR || — || align=right | 4.5 km || 
|-id=868 bgcolor=#E9E9E9
| 136868 ||  || — || March 20, 1998 || Socorro || LINEAR || — || align=right | 4.9 km || 
|-id=869 bgcolor=#fefefe
| 136869 ||  || — || March 20, 1998 || Socorro || LINEAR || FLO || align=right | 1.1 km || 
|-id=870 bgcolor=#fefefe
| 136870 ||  || — || March 20, 1998 || Socorro || LINEAR || — || align=right | 1.4 km || 
|-id=871 bgcolor=#fefefe
| 136871 ||  || — || March 20, 1998 || Socorro || LINEAR || — || align=right | 1.8 km || 
|-id=872 bgcolor=#fefefe
| 136872 ||  || — || March 20, 1998 || Socorro || LINEAR || NYS || align=right | 1.3 km || 
|-id=873 bgcolor=#d6d6d6
| 136873 ||  || — || March 20, 1998 || Socorro || LINEAR || — || align=right | 4.5 km || 
|-id=874 bgcolor=#FFC2E0
| 136874 ||  || — || March 31, 1998 || Socorro || LINEAR || APO +1km || align=right | 3.4 km || 
|-id=875 bgcolor=#d6d6d6
| 136875 ||  || — || March 24, 1998 || Socorro || LINEAR || — || align=right | 4.3 km || 
|-id=876 bgcolor=#d6d6d6
| 136876 ||  || — || March 24, 1998 || Socorro || LINEAR || — || align=right | 4.9 km || 
|-id=877 bgcolor=#d6d6d6
| 136877 ||  || — || March 31, 1998 || Socorro || LINEAR || — || align=right | 6.7 km || 
|-id=878 bgcolor=#fefefe
| 136878 ||  || — || March 20, 1998 || Socorro || LINEAR || EUT || align=right | 1.0 km || 
|-id=879 bgcolor=#d6d6d6
| 136879 ||  || — || March 24, 1998 || Socorro || LINEAR || — || align=right | 4.4 km || 
|-id=880 bgcolor=#fefefe
| 136880 ||  || — || March 22, 1998 || Socorro || LINEAR || NYS || align=right | 1.1 km || 
|-id=881 bgcolor=#fefefe
| 136881 ||  || — || March 20, 1998 || Socorro || LINEAR || — || align=right | 1.3 km || 
|-id=882 bgcolor=#d6d6d6
| 136882 ||  || — || March 20, 1998 || Socorro || LINEAR || — || align=right | 6.7 km || 
|-id=883 bgcolor=#fefefe
| 136883 ||  || — || March 25, 1998 || Socorro || LINEAR || FLO || align=right | 1.5 km || 
|-id=884 bgcolor=#d6d6d6
| 136884 ||  || — || March 29, 1998 || Socorro || LINEAR || — || align=right | 5.5 km || 
|-id=885 bgcolor=#fefefe
| 136885 ||  || — || April 2, 1998 || Socorro || LINEAR || — || align=right | 1.9 km || 
|-id=886 bgcolor=#d6d6d6
| 136886 ||  || — || April 2, 1998 || La Silla || E. W. Elst || — || align=right | 4.2 km || 
|-id=887 bgcolor=#d6d6d6
| 136887 ||  || — || April 18, 1998 || Kitt Peak || Spacewatch || — || align=right | 7.7 km || 
|-id=888 bgcolor=#fefefe
| 136888 ||  || — || April 17, 1998 || Kitt Peak || Spacewatch || — || align=right | 1.2 km || 
|-id=889 bgcolor=#d6d6d6
| 136889 ||  || — || April 18, 1998 || Socorro || LINEAR || — || align=right | 6.7 km || 
|-id=890 bgcolor=#d6d6d6
| 136890 ||  || — || April 20, 1998 || Socorro || LINEAR || — || align=right | 5.9 km || 
|-id=891 bgcolor=#fefefe
| 136891 ||  || — || April 20, 1998 || Socorro || LINEAR || — || align=right | 1.9 km || 
|-id=892 bgcolor=#fefefe
| 136892 ||  || — || April 28, 1998 || Kitt Peak || Spacewatch || V || align=right | 1.0 km || 
|-id=893 bgcolor=#d6d6d6
| 136893 ||  || — || April 18, 1998 || Kitt Peak || Spacewatch || — || align=right | 3.0 km || 
|-id=894 bgcolor=#fefefe
| 136894 ||  || — || April 20, 1998 || Socorro || LINEAR || — || align=right | 1.2 km || 
|-id=895 bgcolor=#d6d6d6
| 136895 ||  || — || April 20, 1998 || Socorro || LINEAR || — || align=right | 7.7 km || 
|-id=896 bgcolor=#d6d6d6
| 136896 ||  || — || April 20, 1998 || Socorro || LINEAR || — || align=right | 7.5 km || 
|-id=897 bgcolor=#FFC2E0
| 136897 ||  || — || April 28, 1998 || Socorro || LINEAR || AMO || align=right data-sort-value="0.71" | 710 m || 
|-id=898 bgcolor=#d6d6d6
| 136898 ||  || — || April 20, 1998 || Socorro || LINEAR || — || align=right | 5.3 km || 
|-id=899 bgcolor=#fefefe
| 136899 ||  || — || April 20, 1998 || Socorro || LINEAR || — || align=right | 1.6 km || 
|-id=900 bgcolor=#FFC2E0
| 136900 ||  || — || April 30, 1998 || Kitt Peak || Spacewatch || APO +1km || align=right | 1.2 km || 
|}

136901–137000 

|-bgcolor=#fefefe
| 136901 ||  || — || April 25, 1998 || Kitt Peak || Spacewatch || — || align=right | 1.6 km || 
|-id=902 bgcolor=#d6d6d6
| 136902 ||  || — || April 21, 1998 || Socorro || LINEAR || — || align=right | 5.5 km || 
|-id=903 bgcolor=#fefefe
| 136903 ||  || — || April 21, 1998 || Socorro || LINEAR || — || align=right data-sort-value="0.97" | 970 m || 
|-id=904 bgcolor=#d6d6d6
| 136904 ||  || — || April 21, 1998 || Socorro || LINEAR || — || align=right | 6.8 km || 
|-id=905 bgcolor=#d6d6d6
| 136905 ||  || — || April 21, 1998 || Socorro || LINEAR || ALA || align=right | 6.6 km || 
|-id=906 bgcolor=#fefefe
| 136906 ||  || — || April 21, 1998 || Socorro || LINEAR || — || align=right | 1.3 km || 
|-id=907 bgcolor=#fefefe
| 136907 ||  || — || April 21, 1998 || Socorro || LINEAR || — || align=right | 1.3 km || 
|-id=908 bgcolor=#fefefe
| 136908 ||  || — || April 21, 1998 || Socorro || LINEAR || FLO || align=right data-sort-value="0.98" | 980 m || 
|-id=909 bgcolor=#fefefe
| 136909 ||  || — || April 21, 1998 || Socorro || LINEAR || V || align=right | 1.3 km || 
|-id=910 bgcolor=#fefefe
| 136910 ||  || — || April 21, 1998 || Socorro || LINEAR || V || align=right | 1.1 km || 
|-id=911 bgcolor=#fefefe
| 136911 ||  || — || April 21, 1998 || Socorro || LINEAR || V || align=right data-sort-value="0.99" | 990 m || 
|-id=912 bgcolor=#fefefe
| 136912 ||  || — || April 21, 1998 || Socorro || LINEAR || NYS || align=right | 1.1 km || 
|-id=913 bgcolor=#fefefe
| 136913 ||  || — || April 21, 1998 || Socorro || LINEAR || — || align=right | 1.3 km || 
|-id=914 bgcolor=#d6d6d6
| 136914 ||  || — || April 25, 1998 || La Silla || E. W. Elst || — || align=right | 8.1 km || 
|-id=915 bgcolor=#d6d6d6
| 136915 ||  || — || April 23, 1998 || Socorro || LINEAR || — || align=right | 8.7 km || 
|-id=916 bgcolor=#d6d6d6
| 136916 ||  || — || April 23, 1998 || Socorro || LINEAR || — || align=right | 5.7 km || 
|-id=917 bgcolor=#fefefe
| 136917 ||  || — || April 18, 1998 || Socorro || LINEAR || — || align=right | 1.4 km || 
|-id=918 bgcolor=#fefefe
| 136918 ||  || — || April 19, 1998 || Socorro || LINEAR || ERI || align=right | 3.1 km || 
|-id=919 bgcolor=#d6d6d6
| 136919 ||  || — || April 21, 1998 || Socorro || LINEAR || TIR || align=right | 7.0 km || 
|-id=920 bgcolor=#d6d6d6
| 136920 ||  || — || April 21, 1998 || Socorro || LINEAR || URS || align=right | 7.2 km || 
|-id=921 bgcolor=#fefefe
| 136921 ||  || — || April 21, 1998 || Socorro || LINEAR || PHO || align=right | 2.8 km || 
|-id=922 bgcolor=#fefefe
| 136922 Brianbauer ||  ||  || April 19, 1998 || Anderson Mesa || M. W. Buie || — || align=right | 2.0 km || 
|-id=923 bgcolor=#FFC2E0
| 136923 ||  || — || May 1, 1998 || Kitt Peak || Spacewatch || AMO +1km || align=right | 2.0 km || 
|-id=924 bgcolor=#fefefe
| 136924 ||  || — || May 24, 1998 || Kitt Peak || Spacewatch || — || align=right | 1.7 km || 
|-id=925 bgcolor=#d6d6d6
| 136925 || 1998 ME || — || June 16, 1998 || Kitt Peak || Spacewatch || — || align=right | 4.1 km || 
|-id=926 bgcolor=#FA8072
| 136926 || 1998 MY || — || June 16, 1998 || Socorro || LINEAR || — || align=right | 1.7 km || 
|-id=927 bgcolor=#fefefe
| 136927 ||  || — || June 16, 1998 || Kitt Peak || Spacewatch || V || align=right | 1.1 km || 
|-id=928 bgcolor=#fefefe
| 136928 ||  || — || June 20, 1998 || Kitt Peak || Spacewatch || — || align=right | 1.4 km || 
|-id=929 bgcolor=#fefefe
| 136929 ||  || — || June 20, 1998 || Kitt Peak || Spacewatch || — || align=right | 1.2 km || 
|-id=930 bgcolor=#fefefe
| 136930 ||  || — || July 24, 1998 || Caussols || ODAS || — || align=right | 1.8 km || 
|-id=931 bgcolor=#fefefe
| 136931 ||  || — || July 30, 1998 || Višnjan Observatory || Višnjan Obs. || — || align=right | 1.9 km || 
|-id=932 bgcolor=#fefefe
| 136932 ||  || — || July 28, 1998 || Xinglong || SCAP || — || align=right | 1.8 km || 
|-id=933 bgcolor=#fefefe
| 136933 ||  || — || August 22, 1998 || Xinglong || SCAP || V || align=right | 1.6 km || 
|-id=934 bgcolor=#fefefe
| 136934 ||  || — || August 19, 1998 || Socorro || LINEAR || H || align=right | 1.2 km || 
|-id=935 bgcolor=#d6d6d6
| 136935 ||  || — || August 24, 1998 || Caussols || ODAS || 3:2 || align=right | 9.5 km || 
|-id=936 bgcolor=#fefefe
| 136936 ||  || — || August 17, 1998 || Socorro || LINEAR || — || align=right | 1.3 km || 
|-id=937 bgcolor=#fefefe
| 136937 ||  || — || August 22, 1998 || Xinglong || SCAP || — || align=right | 1.5 km || 
|-id=938 bgcolor=#fefefe
| 136938 ||  || — || August 17, 1998 || Socorro || LINEAR || — || align=right | 1.2 km || 
|-id=939 bgcolor=#fefefe
| 136939 ||  || — || August 17, 1998 || Socorro || LINEAR || NYS || align=right | 1.6 km || 
|-id=940 bgcolor=#fefefe
| 136940 ||  || — || August 17, 1998 || Socorro || LINEAR || slow || align=right | 1.8 km || 
|-id=941 bgcolor=#fefefe
| 136941 ||  || — || August 30, 1998 || Kitt Peak || Spacewatch || MAS || align=right | 1.1 km || 
|-id=942 bgcolor=#fefefe
| 136942 ||  || — || August 24, 1998 || Socorro || LINEAR || — || align=right | 2.3 km || 
|-id=943 bgcolor=#fefefe
| 136943 ||  || — || August 24, 1998 || Socorro || LINEAR || — || align=right | 1.5 km || 
|-id=944 bgcolor=#fefefe
| 136944 ||  || — || August 24, 1998 || Socorro || LINEAR || — || align=right | 3.3 km || 
|-id=945 bgcolor=#fefefe
| 136945 ||  || — || August 24, 1998 || Socorro || LINEAR || — || align=right | 3.7 km || 
|-id=946 bgcolor=#fefefe
| 136946 ||  || — || August 26, 1998 || La Silla || E. W. Elst || NYS || align=right | 1.1 km || 
|-id=947 bgcolor=#fefefe
| 136947 ||  || — || August 26, 1998 || La Silla || E. W. Elst || NYS || align=right | 1.5 km || 
|-id=948 bgcolor=#fefefe
| 136948 ||  || — || August 25, 1998 || La Silla || E. W. Elst || V || align=right | 1.2 km || 
|-id=949 bgcolor=#fefefe
| 136949 ||  || — || August 23, 1998 || Socorro || LINEAR || NYS || align=right | 1.5 km || 
|-id=950 bgcolor=#E9E9E9
| 136950 ||  || — || September 14, 1998 || Catalina || CSS || — || align=right | 5.9 km || 
|-id=951 bgcolor=#fefefe
| 136951 ||  || — || September 14, 1998 || Socorro || LINEAR || H || align=right data-sort-value="0.87" | 870 m || 
|-id=952 bgcolor=#E9E9E9
| 136952 ||  || — || September 14, 1998 || Socorro || LINEAR || — || align=right | 2.0 km || 
|-id=953 bgcolor=#fefefe
| 136953 ||  || — || September 14, 1998 || Socorro || LINEAR || H || align=right | 1.0 km || 
|-id=954 bgcolor=#fefefe
| 136954 ||  || — || September 14, 1998 || Socorro || LINEAR || H || align=right | 1.0 km || 
|-id=955 bgcolor=#fefefe
| 136955 ||  || — || September 15, 1998 || Caussols || ODAS || — || align=right | 2.0 km || 
|-id=956 bgcolor=#fefefe
| 136956 ||  || — || September 12, 1998 || Kitt Peak || Spacewatch || — || align=right | 1.2 km || 
|-id=957 bgcolor=#fefefe
| 136957 ||  || — || September 13, 1998 || Kitt Peak || Spacewatch || — || align=right | 1.6 km || 
|-id=958 bgcolor=#fefefe
| 136958 ||  || — || September 13, 1998 || Kitt Peak || Spacewatch || MAS || align=right | 1.3 km || 
|-id=959 bgcolor=#fefefe
| 136959 ||  || — || September 15, 1998 || Kitt Peak || Spacewatch || — || align=right | 1.6 km || 
|-id=960 bgcolor=#fefefe
| 136960 ||  || — || September 14, 1998 || Socorro || LINEAR || — || align=right | 1.6 km || 
|-id=961 bgcolor=#fefefe
| 136961 ||  || — || September 14, 1998 || Socorro || LINEAR || MAS || align=right | 1.5 km || 
|-id=962 bgcolor=#fefefe
| 136962 ||  || — || September 14, 1998 || Socorro || LINEAR || NYS || align=right | 1.1 km || 
|-id=963 bgcolor=#fefefe
| 136963 ||  || — || September 14, 1998 || Socorro || LINEAR || V || align=right | 1.4 km || 
|-id=964 bgcolor=#fefefe
| 136964 ||  || — || September 14, 1998 || Socorro || LINEAR || V || align=right | 1.1 km || 
|-id=965 bgcolor=#E9E9E9
| 136965 ||  || — || September 14, 1998 || Socorro || LINEAR || — || align=right | 1.8 km || 
|-id=966 bgcolor=#fefefe
| 136966 ||  || — || September 14, 1998 || Socorro || LINEAR || NYS || align=right | 1.3 km || 
|-id=967 bgcolor=#fefefe
| 136967 ||  || — || September 14, 1998 || Socorro || LINEAR || — || align=right | 2.0 km || 
|-id=968 bgcolor=#E9E9E9
| 136968 ||  || — || September 14, 1998 || Socorro || LINEAR || — || align=right | 1.8 km || 
|-id=969 bgcolor=#fefefe
| 136969 ||  || — || September 14, 1998 || Socorro || LINEAR || V || align=right | 1.5 km || 
|-id=970 bgcolor=#fefefe
| 136970 ||  || — || September 14, 1998 || Socorro || LINEAR || — || align=right | 1.7 km || 
|-id=971 bgcolor=#fefefe
| 136971 ||  || — || September 14, 1998 || Socorro || LINEAR || SUL || align=right | 3.6 km || 
|-id=972 bgcolor=#E9E9E9
| 136972 ||  || — || September 14, 1998 || Socorro || LINEAR || — || align=right | 1.2 km || 
|-id=973 bgcolor=#fefefe
| 136973 ||  || — || September 14, 1998 || Socorro || LINEAR || NYS || align=right | 1.3 km || 
|-id=974 bgcolor=#fefefe
| 136974 ||  || — || September 14, 1998 || Socorro || LINEAR || MAS || align=right | 1.4 km || 
|-id=975 bgcolor=#fefefe
| 136975 ||  || — || September 14, 1998 || Socorro || LINEAR || — || align=right | 1.3 km || 
|-id=976 bgcolor=#d6d6d6
| 136976 ||  || — || September 14, 1998 || Socorro || LINEAR || — || align=right | 5.2 km || 
|-id=977 bgcolor=#fefefe
| 136977 ||  || — || September 14, 1998 || Socorro || LINEAR || — || align=right | 1.7 km || 
|-id=978 bgcolor=#E9E9E9
| 136978 ||  || — || September 14, 1998 || Socorro || LINEAR || — || align=right | 1.6 km || 
|-id=979 bgcolor=#fefefe
| 136979 ||  || — || September 14, 1998 || Socorro || LINEAR || — || align=right | 1.6 km || 
|-id=980 bgcolor=#E9E9E9
| 136980 || 1998 SR || — || September 16, 1998 || Caussols || ODAS || — || align=right | 1.6 km || 
|-id=981 bgcolor=#fefefe
| 136981 ||  || — || September 17, 1998 || Caussols || ODAS || V || align=right | 1.2 km || 
|-id=982 bgcolor=#fefefe
| 136982 ||  || — || September 17, 1998 || Caussols || ODAS || ERI || align=right | 4.2 km || 
|-id=983 bgcolor=#fefefe
| 136983 ||  || — || September 17, 1998 || Kitt Peak || Spacewatch || MAS || align=right | 1.7 km || 
|-id=984 bgcolor=#E9E9E9
| 136984 ||  || — || September 21, 1998 || Ondřejov || P. Pravec || — || align=right | 1.9 km || 
|-id=985 bgcolor=#E9E9E9
| 136985 ||  || — || September 22, 1998 || Caussols || ODAS || GER || align=right | 2.3 km || 
|-id=986 bgcolor=#E9E9E9
| 136986 ||  || — || September 16, 1998 || Kitt Peak || Spacewatch || — || align=right | 1.1 km || 
|-id=987 bgcolor=#E9E9E9
| 136987 ||  || — || September 21, 1998 || Kitt Peak || Spacewatch || — || align=right | 1.4 km || 
|-id=988 bgcolor=#fefefe
| 136988 ||  || — || September 26, 1998 || Socorro || LINEAR || H || align=right | 1.3 km || 
|-id=989 bgcolor=#fefefe
| 136989 ||  || — || September 26, 1998 || Socorro || LINEAR || H || align=right | 1.0 km || 
|-id=990 bgcolor=#fefefe
| 136990 ||  || — || September 26, 1998 || Socorro || LINEAR || H || align=right data-sort-value="0.97" | 970 m || 
|-id=991 bgcolor=#E9E9E9
| 136991 ||  || — || September 28, 1998 || Prescott || P. G. Comba || — || align=right | 1.5 km || 
|-id=992 bgcolor=#E9E9E9
| 136992 ||  || — || September 25, 1998 || Kitt Peak || Spacewatch || slow? || align=right | 2.6 km || 
|-id=993 bgcolor=#FFC2E0
| 136993 ||  || — || September 29, 1998 || Socorro || LINEAR || APO +1kmmoon || align=right data-sort-value="0.99" | 990 m || 
|-id=994 bgcolor=#fefefe
| 136994 ||  || — || September 17, 1998 || Anderson Mesa || LONEOS || — || align=right | 2.2 km || 
|-id=995 bgcolor=#fefefe
| 136995 ||  || — || September 17, 1998 || Anderson Mesa || LONEOS || MAS || align=right | 1.4 km || 
|-id=996 bgcolor=#fefefe
| 136996 ||  || — || September 26, 1998 || Xinglong || SCAP || — || align=right | 2.7 km || 
|-id=997 bgcolor=#fefefe
| 136997 ||  || — || September 21, 1998 || La Silla || E. W. Elst || MAS || align=right | 1.7 km || 
|-id=998 bgcolor=#E9E9E9
| 136998 ||  || — || September 21, 1998 || La Silla || E. W. Elst || — || align=right | 1.6 km || 
|-id=999 bgcolor=#fefefe
| 136999 ||  || — || September 19, 1998 || Socorro || LINEAR || — || align=right | 1.8 km || 
|-id=000 bgcolor=#fefefe
| 137000 ||  || — || September 26, 1998 || Socorro || LINEAR || — || align=right | 1.6 km || 
|}

References

External links 
 Discovery Circumstances: Numbered Minor Planets (135001)–(140000) (IAU Minor Planet Center)

0136